Indonesia, with its vast islands, tropical weather and rainforests is one of the world's richest and most important countries in terms of biodiversity. In addition to the many resident birds, a considerable number of migratory species winter in the country to escape their northern breeding grounds.

The avifauna of Indonesia include a total of 1806 species, of which 786 are endemic, and 3 have been introduced by humans. 150 species are globally threatened.

This list's taxonomic treatment (designation and sequence of orders, families and species) and nomenclature (common and scientific names) follow the conventions of The Clements Checklist of Birds of the World, 2022 edition. The family accounts at the beginning of each heading reflect this taxonomy, as do the species counts in each family account. Introduced and accidental species are included in the total counts for Indonesia.

The following tags have been used to highlight several categories. The commonly occurring native species do not fall into any of these categories.

(A) Accidental - a species that rarely or accidentally occurs in Indonesia
(E) Endemic - a species that is native only to Indonesia
(Ex) Extirpated - a species that no longer occurs in Indonesia although populations exist elsewhere
(I) Introduced - a species introduced to Indonesia as a consequence, direct or indirect, of human actions

Cassowaries and emu
Order: StruthioniformesFamily: Casuariidae

The cassowaries are large flightless birds native to Australia and New Guinea.

 Southern cassowary, Casuarius casuarius
 Dwarf cassowary, Casuarius bennetti
 Northern cassowary, Casuarius unappendiculatus

Magpie goose
Order: AnseriformesFamily: Anseranatidae

The family contains a single species, the magpie goose. It was an early and distinctive offshoot of the anseriform family tree, diverging after the screamers and before all other ducks, geese and swans, sometime in the late Cretaceous.

 Magpie goose, Anseranas semipalmata

Ducks, geese, and waterfowl
Order: AnseriformesFamily: Anatidae

Anatidae includes the ducks and most duck-like waterfowl, such as geese and swans. These birds are adapted to an aquatic existence with webbed feet, flattened bills, and feathers that are excellent at shedding water due to an oily coating.

 Spotted whistling-duck, Dendrocygna guttata
 Plumed whistling-duck, Dendrocygna eytoni (A) 
 Wandering whistling-duck, Dendrocygna arcuata
 Lesser whistling-duck, Dendrocygna javanica
 Black swan, Cygnus atratus (A)
 Radjah shelduck, Radjah radjah
 Green pygmy-goose, Nettapus pulchellus
 Cotton pygmy-goose, Nettapus coromandelianus 
 Salvadori's teal, Salvadorina waigiuensis
 Garganey, Spatula querquedula
 Eurasian wigeon, Mareca penelope (A)
 Pacific black duck, Anas superciliosa
 Mallard, Anas platyrhynchos (A)
 Northern pintail, Anas acuta (A)
 Sunda teal, Anas gibberifrons 
 Gray teal, Anas gracilis
 White-winged duck, Asarcornis scutulata
 Hardhead, Aythya australis 
 Tufted duck, Aythya fuligula (A)

Megapodes
Order: GalliformesFamily: Megapodiidae

The Megapodiidae are stocky, medium-large chicken-like birds with small heads and large feet. All but the malleefowl occupy jungle habitats and most have brown or black colouring.

 Wattled brushturkey, Aepypodius arfakianus
 Waigeo brushturkey, Aepypodius bruijnii (E)
 Red-billed brushturkey, Talegalla cuvieri (E)
 Yellow-legged brushturkey, Talegalla fuscirostris 
 Red-legged brushturkey, Talegalla jobiensis 
 Maleo, Macrocephalon maleo (E)
 Moluccan scrubfowl, Eulipoa wallacei (E)
 Tabon scrubfowl, Megapodius cumingii 
 Sula scrubfowl, Megapodius bernsteinii (E)
 Tanimbar scrubfowl, Megapodius tenimberensis (E) 
 Dusky scrubfowl, Megapodius freycinet (E) 
 Biak scrubfowl, Megapodius geelvinkianus (E)
 Forsten's scrubfowl, Megapodius forsteni (E)
 New Guinea scrubfowl, Megapodius decollatus 
 Orange-footed scrubfowl, Megapodius reinwardt

Pheasants, grouse, and allies
Order: GalliformesFamily: Phasianidae

The Phasianidae are a family of terrestrial birds. In general, they are plump (although they vary in size) and have broad, relatively short wings.

 Ferruginous partridge, Caloperdix oculea
 Crested partridge, Rollulus rouloul
 Black partridge, Melanoperdix niger
 Red-billed partridge, Arborophila rubrirostris (E)
 Red-breasted partridge, Arborophila hyperythra (E)
 Roll's partridge, Arborophila rolli
 Sumatran partridge, Arborophila sumatrana 
 Chestnut-bellied partridge, Arborophila javanica (E)
 Gray-breasted partridge, Arborophila orientalis (E)
 Long-billed partridge, Rhizothera longirostris 
 Dulit partridge, Rhizothera dulitensis
 Bulwer's pheasant, Lophura bulweri
 Malayan crestless fireback, Lophura erythrophthalma
 Bornean crestless fireback, Lophura pyronota
 Salvadori's pheasant, Lophura inornata (E)
 Malayan crested fireback, Lophura rufa
 Bornean crested fireback, Lophura ignita
 Great argus, Argusianus argus
 Green peafowl, Pavo muticus
 Chestnut-necklaced partridge, Tropicoperdix charltonii
 Sabah partridge, Tropicoperdix graydoni'
 Crimson-headed partridge, Haematortyx sanguiniceps Bornean peacock-pheasant, Polyplectron schleiermacheri 
 Bronze-tailed peacock-pheasant, Polyplectron chalcurum (E)
 Green junglefowl, Gallus varius (E)
 Red junglefowl, Gallus gallus Brown quail, Synoicus ypsilophorus 
 Snow Mountain quail, Synoicus monorthonyx  
 Blue-breasted quail, Synoicus chinensisGrebes
Order: PodicipediformesFamily: Podicipedidae

Grebes are small to medium-large freshwater diving birds. They have lobed toes and are excellent swimmers and divers. Their feet are placed far back on the body, making them quite ungainly on land.

 Little grebe, Tachybaptus ruficollis Australasian grebe, Tachybaptus novaehollandiae 
 Great crested grebe, Podiceps cristatus (A)

Pigeons and doves
Order: ColumbiformesFamily: Columbidae

Pigeons and doves are stout-bodied birds with short necks and short slender bills with a fleshy cere.

 Rock pigeon, Columba livia Silvery wood-pigeon, Columba argentina (E)
 Metallic pigeon, Columba vitiensis 
 Sunda collared-dove, Streptopelia bitorquata 
 Red collared-dove, Streptopelia tranquebarica 
 Spotted dove, Streptopelia chinensis 
 Barred cuckoo-dove, Macropygia unchall 
 Flores Sea cuckoo-dove, Macropygia macassariensis 
 Timor cuckoo-dove, Macropygia magna (E)
 Tanimbar cuckoo-dove, Macropygia timorlaoensis (E)
 Amboyna cuckoo-dove, Macropygia amboinensis 
 Sultan's cuckoo-dove, Macropygia doreya Philippine cuckoo-dove, Macropygia tenuirostris 
 Ruddy cuckoo-dove, Macropygia emiliana 
 Enggano cuckoo-dove, Macropygia cinnamomea (E)
 Barusan cuckoo-dove, Macropygia modiglianii Black-billed cuckoo-dove, Macropygia nigrirostris 
 Little cuckoo-dove, Macropygia ruficeps 
 Great cuckoo-dove, Reinwardtoena reinwardti 
 White-faced cuckoo-dove, Turacoena manadensis (E)
 Sula cuckoo-dove, Turacoena sulaensis Slaty cuckoo-dove, Turacoena modesta (E)
 Asian emerald dove, Chalcophaps indica Pacific emerald dove, Chalcophaps longirostris 
 Stephan's dove, Chalcophaps stephani 
 New Guinea bronzewing, Henicophaps albifrons 
 Wetar ground dove, Alopecoenas hoedtii (E)
 Bronze ground dove, Alopecoenas beccarii White-bibbed ground dove, Alopecoenas jobiensis Zebra dove, Geopelia striata Peaceful dove, Geopelia placida Barred dove, Geopelia maugeus (E)
 Bar-shouldered dove, Geopelia humeralis Nicobar pigeon, Caloenas nicobarica Sulawesi ground dove, Gallicolumba tristigmata (E)
 Cinnamon ground dove, Gallicolumba rufigula 
 Thick-billed ground-pigeon, Trugon terrestris 
 Pheasant pigeon, Otidiphaps nobilis 
 Western crowned-pigeon, Goura cristata Sclater's crowned-pigeon, Goura sclaterii 
 Scheepmaker's crowned-pigeon, Goura scheepmakeri 
 Victoria crowned-pigeon, Goura victoria 
 Little green-pigeon, Treron olax 
 Pink-necked green-pigeon, Treron vernans Cinnamon-headed green-pigeon, Treron fulvicollis 
 Orange-breasted green-pigeon, Treron bicinctus 
 Buru green-pigeon, Treron aromaticus 
 Thick-billed green-pigeon, Treron curvirostra 
 Gray-cheeked green-pigeon, Treron griseicauda (E)
 Sumba green-pigeon, Treron teysmannii (E) 
 Flores green-pigeon, Treron floris (E) 
 Timor green-pigeon, Treron psittaceus (E)
 Large green-pigeon, Treron capellei 
 Green-spectacled green-pigeon, Treron oxyurus (E) 
 Wedge-tailed green-pigeon, Treron sphenurus Black-backed fruit-dove, Ptilinopus cinctus (E)
 Red-naped fruit-dove, Ptilinopus dohertyi (E)
 Pink-headed fruit-dove, Ptilinopus porphyreus (E)
 Red-eared fruit-dove, Ptilinopus fischeri (E)
 Jambu fruit-dove, Ptilinopus jambu Maroon-chinned fruit-dove, Ptilinopus epius (E)
 Banggai fruit-dove, Ptilinopus subgularis (E)
 Sula fruit-dove, Ptilinopus mangoliensis (E)
 Scarlet-breasted fruit-dove, Ptilinopus bernsteinii (E)
 Wompoo fruit-dove, Ptilinopus magnificus Pink-spotted fruit-dove, Ptilinopus perlatus Ornate fruit-dove, Ptilinopus ornatus 
 Orange-fronted fruit-dove, Ptilinopus aurantiifrons Wallace's fruit-dove, Ptilinopus wallacii (E)
 Superb fruit-dove, Ptilinopus superbus Rose-crowned fruit-dove, Ptilinopus regina 
 Coroneted fruit-dove, Ptilinopus coronulatus Beautiful fruit-dove, Ptilinopus pulchellus 
 Blue-capped fruit-dove, Ptilinopus monacha (E)
 White-breasted fruit-dove, Ptilinopus rivoli Yellow-bibbed fruit-dove, Ptilinopus solomonensis Geelvink fruit-dove, Ptilinopus speciosus (E)
 Claret-breasted fruit-dove, Ptilinopus viridis Orange-bellied fruit-dove, Ptilinopus iozonus Gray-headed fruit-dove, Ptilinopus hyogastrus (E)
 Carunculated fruit-dove, Ptilinopus granulifrons (E)
 Black-naped fruit-dove, Ptilinopus melanospilus 
 Dwarf fruit-dove, Ptilinopus nainus White-bellied imperial-pigeon, Ducula forsteni (E)
 Gray-headed imperial-pigeon, Ducula radiata (E)
 Green imperial-pigeon, Ducula aenea 
 Enggano imperial-pigeon, Ducula oenothorax (E)
 Spectacled imperial-pigeon, Ducula perspicillata (E)
 Seram imperial-pigeon, Ducula neglecta (E)
 Elegant imperial-pigeon, Ducula concinna (E)
 Spice imperial-pigeon, Ducula myristicivora (E) 
 Geelvink imperial-pigeon, Ducula geelvinkiana (E)
 Purple-tailed imperial-pigeon, Ducula rufigaster Cinnamon-bellied imperial-pigeon, Ducula basilica (E)
 Rufescent imperial-pigeon, Ducula chalconota 
 Pink-headed imperial-pigeon, Ducula rosacea (E)
 Gray imperial-pigeon, Ducula pickeringii 
 Pinon's imperial-pigeon, Ducula pinon Collared imperial-pigeon, Ducula mullerii 
 Zoe's imperial-pigeon, Ducula zoeae 
 Mountain imperial-pigeon, Ducula badia 
 Dark-backed imperial-pigeon, Ducula lacernulata (E)
 Timor imperial-pigeon, Ducula cineracea (E)
 Pied imperial-pigeon, Ducula bicolor 
 Torresian imperial-pigeon, Ducula spilorrhoa Silver-tipped imperial-pigeon, Ducula luctuosa (E)
 Sombre pigeon, Cryptophaps poecilorrhoa (E)
 Papuan mountain-pigeon, Gymnophaps albertisii Buru mountain-pigeon, Gymnophaps mada (E)
 Seram mountain-pigeon, Gymnophaps stalkeri (E)

Bustards
Order: OtidiformesFamily: Otididae

Bustards are large terrestrial birds mainly associated with dry open country and steppes in the Old World. They are omnivorous and nest on the ground. They walk steadily on strong legs and big toes, pecking for food as they go. They have long broad wings with "fingered" wingtips and striking patterns in flight. Many have interesting mating displays.

 Australian bustard, Ardeotis australisCuckoos
Order: CuculiformesFamily: Cuculidae

The family Cuculidae includes cuckoos, roadrunners, and anis. These birds are of variable size with slender bodies, long tails, and strong legs. Many Old World cuckoo species are brood parasites.

 Sumatran ground-cuckoo, Carpococcyx viridis (E)
 Bornean ground-cuckoo, Carpococcyx radiatus Biak coucal, Centropus chalybeus (E)
 Greater black coucal, Centropus menbeki Short-toed coucal, Centropus rectunguis 
 Bay coucal, Centropus celebensis (E)
 Sunda coucal, Centropus nigrorufus (E)
 Greater coucal, Centropus sinensis 
 Goliath coucal, Centropus goliath (E)
 Lesser coucal, Centropus bengalensis Lesser black coucal, Centropus bernsteini 
 Pheasant coucal, Centropus phasianinus Raffles's malkoha, Rhinortha chlorophaea 
 Red-billed malkoha, Zanclostomus javanicus Chestnut-breasted malkoha, Phaenicophaeus curvirostris Chestnut-bellied malkoha, Phaenicophaeus sumatranus 
 Black-bellied malkoha, Phaenicophaeus diardi Green-billed malkoha, Phaenicophaeus tristis Yellow-billed malkoha, Rhamphococcyx calyorhynchus (E)
 Chestnut-winged cuckoo, Clamator coromandus 
 Dwarf koel, Microdynamis parva Asian koel, Eudynamys scolopaceus Black-billed koel, Eudynamys melanorhynchus (E)
 Pacific koel, Eudynamys orientalis Channel-billed cuckoo, Scythrops novaehollandiae Asian emerald cuckoo, Chrysococcyx maculatus Violet cuckoo, Chrysococcyx xanthorhynchus 
 Long-billed cuckoo, Chrysococcyx megarhynchus 
 Horsfield's bronze-cuckoo, Chrysococcyx basalis 
 Black-eared cuckoo, Chrysococcyx osculans 
 Rufous-throated bronze-cuckoo, Chrysococcyx ruficollis Shining bronze-cuckoo, Chrysococcyx lucidus White-eared bronze-cuckoo, Chrysococcyx meyerii Little bronze-cuckoo, Chrysococcyx minutillus Pallid cuckoo, Cacomantis pallidus 
 White-crowned koel, Cacomantis leucolophus Chestnut-breasted cuckoo, Cacomantis castaneiventris Fan-tailed cuckoo, Cacomantis flabelliformis Banded bay cuckoo, Cacomantis sonneratii Plaintive cuckoo, Cacomantis merulinus Moluccan cuckoo, Cacomantis aeruginosus (E)
 Brush cuckoo, Cacomantis variolosus Square-tailed drongo-cuckoo, Surniculus lugubris 
 Moluccan drongo-cuckoo, Surniculus musschenbroeki Moustached hawk-cuckoo, Hierococcyx vagans 
 Large hawk-cuckoo, Hierococcyx sparverioides 
 Dark hawk-cuckoo, Hierococcyx bocki Northern hawk-cuckoo, Hierococcyx hyperythrus 
 Hodgson's hawk-cuckoo, Hierococcyx nisicolor 
 Malaysian hawk-cuckoo, Hierococcyx fugax 
 Sulawesi cuckoo, Cuculus crassirostris (E)
 Indian cuckoo, Cuculus micropterus Himalayan cuckoo, Cuculus saturatus 
 Sunda cuckoo, Cuculus lepidus Common cuckoo, Cuculus canorus 
 Oriental cuckoo, Cuculus optatus 

Frogmouths
Order: CaprimulgiformesFamily: Podargidae

The frogmouths are a group of nocturnal birds related to the nightjars. They are named for their large flattened hooked bill and huge frog-like gape, which they use to take insects.

 Marbled frogmouth, Podargus ocellatus 
 Papuan frogmouth, Podargus papuensis 
 Large frogmouth, Batrachostomus auritus Dulit frogmouth, Batrachostomus harterti 
 Gould's frogmouth, Batrachostomus stellatus Sumatran frogmouth, Batrachostomus poliolophus (E)
 Bornean frogmouth, Batrachostomus mixtus 
 Javan frogmouth, Batrachostomus javensis (E)
 Blyth's frogmouth, Batrachostomus affinis 
 Sunda frogmouth, Batrachostomus cornutusNightjars and allies
Order: CaprimulgiformesFamily: Caprimulgidae

Nightjars are medium-sized nocturnal birds that usually nest on the ground. They have long wings, short legs and very short bills. Most have small feet, of little use for walking, and long pointed wings. Their soft plumage is camouflaged to resemble bark or leaves.

 Spotted nightjar, Eurostopodus argus 
 Solomons nightjar, Eurostopodus nigripennis White-throated nightjar, Eurostopodus mystacalis 
 Diabolical nightjar, Eurostopodus diabolicus (E)
 Papuan nightjar, Eurostopodus papuensis 
 Archbold's nightjar, Eurostopodus archboldi 
 Malaysian eared-nightjar, Lyncornis temminckii Great eared-nightjar, Lyncornis macrotis Gray nightjar, Caprimulgus jotaka 
 Large-tailed nightjar, Caprimulgus macrurus 
 Mees's nightjar, Caprimulgus meesi (E)
 Sulawesi nightjar, Caprimulgus celebensis (E) 
 Savanna nightjar, Caprimulgus affinis 
 Bonaparte's nightjar, Caprimulgus concretus 
 Salvadori's nightjar, Caprimulgus pulchellus (E)

Owlet-nightjars
Order: CaprimulgiformesFamily: Aegothelidae

The owlet-nightjars are small nocturnal birds related to the nightjars and frogmouths. They are insectivores which hunt mostly in the air. Their soft plumage is a mixture of browns and paler shades.

 Feline owlet-nightjar, Aegotheles insignis Starry owlet-nightjar, Aegotheles tatei (A)
 Wallace's owlet-nightjar, Aegotheles wallacii * [
 Mountain owlet-nightjar, Aegotheles albertisi Moluccan owlet-nightjar, Aegotheles crinifrons (E)
 Australian owlet-nightjar, Aegotheles cristatus Vogelkop owlet-nightjar, Aegotheles affinis (E)
 Barred owlet-nightjar, Aegotheles bennettiiSwifts
Order: CaprimulgiformesFamily: Apodidae

Swifts are small birds which spend the majority of their lives flying. These birds have very short legs and never settle voluntarily on the ground, perching instead only on vertical surfaces. Many swifts have long swept-back wings which resemble a crescent or boomerang.

 Papuan spinetailed swift, Mearnsia novaeguineae 
 Silver-rumped needletail, Rhaphidura leucopygialis 
 White-throated needletail, Hirundapus caudacutus 
 Silver-backed needletail, Hirundapus cochinchinensis 
 Brown-backed needletail, Hirundapus giganteus Purple needletail, Hirundapus celebensis 
 Waterfall swift, Hydrochous gigas Bornean swiftlet, Collocalia dodgei (A)
 Cave swiftlet, Collocalia linchi 
 Plume-toed swiftlet, Collocalia affinis Tenggara swiftlet, Collocalia sumbawae Drab swiftlet, Collocalia neglecta Glossy swiftlet, Collocalia esculenta Sulawesi swiftlet, Aerodramus sororum (E)
 Halmahera swiftlet, Aerodramus infuscatus (E)
 Seram swiftlet, Aerodramus ceramensis (E)
 Mountain swiftlet, Aerodramus hirundinaceus Volcano swiftlet, Aerodramus vulcanorum (E)
 Bare-legged swiftlet, Aerodramus nuditarsus Uniform swiftlet, Aerodramus vanikorensis Mossy-nest swiftlet, Aerodramus salangana Black-nest swiftlet, Aerodramus maximus 
 White-nest swiftlet, Aerodramus fuciphagus 
 Germain's swiftlet, Aerodramus germani Three-toed swiftlet, Aerodramus papuensis 
 Pacific swift, Apus pacificus House swift, Apus nipalensis Asian palm-swift, Cypsiurus balasiensisTreeswifts
Order: CaprimulgiformesFamily: Hemiprocnidae

The treeswifts, also called crested swifts, are closely related to the true swifts. They differ from the other swifts in that they have crests, long forked tails and softer plumage.

 Gray-rumped treeswift, Hemiprocne longipennis Whiskered treeswift, Hemiprocne comata 
 Moustached treeswift, Hemiprocne mystaceaRails, gallinules, and coots
Order: GruiformesFamily: Rallidae

Rallidae is a large family of small to medium-sized birds which includes the rails, crakes, coots, and gallinules. Typically they inhabit dense vegetation in damp environments near lakes, swamps, or rivers. In general they are shy and secretive birds, making them difficult to observe. Most species have strong legs and long toes which are well adapted to soft uneven surfaces. They tend to have short, rounded wings and appear to be weak fliers.

 Snoring rail, Aramidopsis plateni (E)
 Slaty-breasted rail, Lewinia striata 
 Lewin's rail, Lewinia pectoralis Blue-faced rail, Gymnocrex rosenbergii (E)
 Bare-eyed rail, Gymnocrex plumbeiventris 
 Talaud rail, Gymnocrex talaudensis (E)
 Invisible rail, Gallirallus wallacii (E)
 Chestnut rail, Gallirallus castaneoventris 
 Buff-banded rail, Gallirallus philippensis 
 Barred rail, Gallirallus torquatus 
 Eurasian moorhen, Gallinula chloropus 
 Dusky moorhen, Gallinula tenebrosa 
 Eurasian coot, Fulica atra (A)
 Black-backed swamphen, Porphyrio indicus (E)
 Australasian swamphen, Porphyrio melanotus 
 Philippine swamphen, Porphyrio pulverulentus (A)
 White-browed crake, Poliolimnas cinereus New Guinea flightless rail, Megacrex inepta Watercock, Gallicrex cinerea Isabelline bush-hen, Amaurornis isabellinus (E)
 White-breasted waterhen, Amaurornis phoenicurus 
 Talaud bush-hen, Amaurornis magnirostris (E)
 Pale-vented bush-hen, Amaurornis moluccana  
 Chestnut forest-rail, Rallina rubra White-striped forest-rail, Rallina leucospila (E)
 Forbes's rail, Rallina forbesi 
 Mayr's rail, Rallina mayri Red-necked crake, Rallina tricolor 
 Red-legged crake, Rallina fasciata 
 Slaty-legged crake, Rallina eurizonoides Ruddy-breasted crake, Zapornia fusca Band-bellied crake, Zapornia paykullii Baillon's crake, Zapornia pusilla 
 Spotless crake, Zapornia tabuensis 

Finfoots
Order: GruiformesFamily: Heliornithidae

Heliornithidae is small family of tropical birds with webbed lobes on their feet similar to those of grebes and coots.

 Masked finfoot, Heliopais personatus (A)

Cranes
Order: GruiformesFamily: Gruidae

Cranes are large, long-legged, and long-necked birds. Unlike the similar-looking but unrelated herons, cranes fly with necks outstretched, not pulled back. Most have elaborate and noisy courting displays or "dances".

 Brolga, Grus rubicundaThick-knees
Order: CharadriiformesFamily: Burhinidae

The thick-knees are found worldwide within the tropical zone, with some species also breeding in temperate Europe and Australia. They are medium to large waders with strong black or yellow-black bills, large yellow eyes, and cryptic plumage. Despite being classed as waders, most species have a preference for arid or semi-arid habitats.

 Bush thick-knee, Burhinus grallarius (A)
 Beach thick-knee, Esacus magnirostrisStilts and avocets
Order: CharadriiformesFamily: Recurvirostridae

Recurvirostridae is a family of large wading birds which includes the avocets and stilts. The avocets have long legs and long up-curved bills. The stilts have extremely long legs and long, thin, straight bills.

 Black-winged stilt, Himantopus himantopus (A)
 Pied stilt, Himantopus leucocephalus Black-necked stilt, Himantopus mexicanus 
 Pied avocet, Recurvirostra avosetta (A)
 Red-necked avocet, Recurvirostra novaehollandiae (A)

Oystercatchers
Order: CharadriiformesFamily: Haematopodidae

The oystercatchers are large and noisy plover-like birds, with strong bills used for smashing or prising open molluscs.

 Eurasian oystercatcher, Haematopus ostralegus (A)
 Pied oystercatcher, Haematopus longirostris 
 Sooty oystercatcher, Haematopus fuliginosus (A)

Plovers and lapwings
Order: CharadriiformesFamily: Charadriidae

The family Charadriidae includes the plovers, dotterels, and lapwings. They are small to medium-sized birds with compact bodies, short thick necks, and long, usually pointed, wings. They are found in open country worldwide, mostly in habitats near water.

 Black-bellied plover, Pluvialis squatarola 
 Pacific golden-plover, Pluvialis fulva Gray-headed lapwing, Vanellus cinereus (A)
 Red-wattled lapwing, Vanellus indicus (A)
 Javan lapwing, Vanellus macropterus (E)
 Masked lapwing, Vanellus miles Lesser sand-plover, Charadrius mongolus 
 Greater sand-plover, Charadrius leschenaultii Red-capped plover, Charadrius ruficapillus 
 Malaysian plover, Charadrius peronii Kentish plover, Charadrius alexandrinus 
 White-faced plover, Charadrius dealbatus Javan plover, Charadrius javanicus (E)
 Common ringed plover, Charadrius hiaticula (A)
 Long-billed plover, Charadrius placidus Little ringed plover, Charadrius dubius Oriental plover, Charadrius veredus Red-kneed dotterel, Erythrogonys cinctus 
 Black-fronted dotterel, Elseyornis melanops (A)

Painted-snipes
Order: CharadriiformesFamily: Rostratulidae

Painted-snipes are short-legged, long-billed birds similar in shape to the true snipes, but more brightly coloured.

 Greater painted-snipe, Rostratula benghalensisJacanas
Order: CharadriiformesFamily: Jacanidae

The jacanas are a group of waders found throughout the tropics. They are identifiable by their huge feet and claws which enable them to walk on floating vegetation in the shallow lakes that are their preferred habitat.

 Comb-crested jacana, Irediparra gallinacea 
 Pheasant-tailed jacana, Hydrophasianus chirurgus 
 Bronze-winged jacana, Metopidius indicusSandpipers and allies
Order: CharadriiformesFamily: Scolopacidae

Scolopacidae is a large diverse family of small to medium-sized shorebirds including the sandpipers, curlews, godwits, shanks, tattlers, woodcocks, snipes, dowitchers, and phalaropes. The majority of these species eat small invertebrates picked out of the mud or soil. Variation in length of legs and bills enables multiple species to feed in the same habitat, particularly on the coast, without direct competition for food.

 Bristle-thighed curlew, Numenius tahitiensis (A)
 Whimbrel, Numenius phaeopus 
 Little curlew, Numenius minutus 
 Far Eastern curlew, Numenius madagascariensis Eurasian curlew, Numenius arquata Bar-tailed godwit, Limosa lapponica 
 Black-tailed godwit, Limosa limosa 
 Ruddy turnstone, Arenaria interpres Great knot, Calidris tenuirostris 
 Red knot, Calidris canutus 
 Ruff, Calidris pugnax Broad-billed sandpiper, Calidris falcinellus Sharp-tailed sandpiper, Calidris acuminata 
 Curlew sandpiper, Calidris ferruginea Temminck's stint, Calidris temminckii Long-toed stint, Calidris subminuta Spoon-billed sandpiper, Calidris pygmaea (A)
 Red-necked stint, Calidris ruficollis Sanderling, Calidris alba Little stint, Calidris minuta (A)
 Buff-breasted sandpiper, Calidris subruficollis (A)
 Pectoral sandpiper, Calidris melanotos (A)
 Asian dowitcher, Limnodromus semipalmatus Long-billed dowitcher, Limnodromus scolopaceus Javan woodcock, Scolopax saturata (E)
 New Guinea woodcock, Scolopax rosenbergii 
 Sulawesi woodcock, Scolopax celebensis (E)
 Moluccan woodcock, Scolopax rochussenii (E)
 Latham's snipe, Gallinago hardwickii Common snipe, Gallinago gallinago 
 Pin-tailed snipe, Gallinago stenura 
 Swinhoe's snipe, Gallinago megala Terek sandpiper, Xenus cinereus 
 Red-necked phalarope, Phalaropus lobatus Common sandpiper, Actitis hypoleucos Green sandpiper, Tringa ochropus Gray-tailed tattler, Tringa brevipes Wandering tattler, Tringa incana 
 Spotted redshank, Tringa erythropus 
 Common greenshank, Tringa nebularia 
 Nordmann's greenshank, Tringa guttifer 
 Lesser yellowlegs, Tringa flavipes (A)
 Marsh sandpiper, Tringa stagnatilis 
 Wood sandpiper, Tringa glareola 
 Common redshank, Tringa totanus 

Buttonquail
Order: CharadriiformesFamily: Turnicidae

The buttonquail are small, drab, running birds which resemble the true quails. The female is the brighter of the sexes and initiates courtship. The male incubates the eggs and tends the young.

 Small buttonquail, Turnix sylvaticus 
 Red-backed buttonquail, Turnix maculosus Barred buttonquail, Turnix suscitator 
 Sumba buttonquail, Turnix everetti (E)

Pratincoles and coursers
Order: CharadriiformesFamily: Glareolidae

Glareolidae is a family of wading birds comprising the pratincoles, which have short legs, long pointed wings, and long forked tails, and the coursers, which have long legs, short wings, and long, pointed bills which curve downwards.

 Australian pratincole, Stiltia isabella Oriental pratincole, Glareola maldivarumSkuas and jaegers
Order: CharadriiformesFamily: Stercorariidae

The family Stercorariidae are, in general, medium to large birds, typically with grey or brown plumage, often with white markings on the wings. They nest on the ground in temperate and arctic regions and are long-distance migrants.

 South polar skua, Stercorarius maccormicki (A)
 Pomarine jaeger, Stercorarius pomarinus 
 Parasitic jaeger, Stercorarius parasiticus 
 Long-tailed jaeger, Stercorarius longicaudusGulls, terns, and skimmers
Order: CharadriiformesFamily: Laridae

Laridae is a family of medium to large seabirds, the gulls, terns, and skimmers. They are typically grey or white, often with black markings on the head or wings. They have stout, longish bills and webbed feet. Terns are a group of generally medium to large seabirds typically with grey or white plumage, often with black markings on the head. Most terns hunt fish by diving but some pick insects off the surface of fresh water. Terns are generally long-lived birds, with several species known to live in excess of 30 years. Skimmers are a small family of tropical tern-like birds. They have an elongated lower mandible which they use to feed by flying low over the water surface and skimming the water for small fish.

 Sabine's gull, Xema sabini (A)
 Silver gull, Chroicocephalus novaehollandiae 
 Black-headed gull, Chroicocephalus ridibundus 
 Brown-headed gull, Chroicocephalus brunnicephalus (A) 
 Lesser black-backed gull, Larus fuscus (A) 
 Slaty-backed gull, Larus schistisagus (A) 
 Brown noddy, Anous stolidus Black noddy, Anous minutus 
 White tern, Gygis alba 
 Sooty tern, Onychoprion fuscatus 
 Gray-backed tern, Onychoprion lunatus (A)
 Bridled tern, Onychoprion anaethetus 
 Aleutian tern, Onychoprion aleuticus 
 Little tern, Sternula albifrons 
 Gull-billed tern, Gelochelidon nilotica 
 Caspian tern, Hydroprogne caspia 
 White-winged tern, Chlidonias leucopterus Whiskered tern, Chlidonias hybrida 
 Roseate tern, Sterna dougallii 
 Black-naped tern, Sterna sumatrana 
 Common tern, Sterna hirundo 
 Great crested tern, Thalasseus bergii Lesser crested tern, Thalasseus bengalensis 
 Chinese crested tern, Thalasseus bernsteini 

Tropicbirds
Order: PhaethontiformesFamily: Phaethontidae

Tropicbirds are slender white birds of tropical oceans with exceptionally long central tail feathers. Their heads and long wings have black markings.

 White-tailed tropicbird, Phaethon lepturus 
 Red-billed tropicbird, Phaethon aethereus (A)
 Red-tailed tropicbird, Phaethon rubricaudaSouthern storm-petrels
Order: ProcellariiformesFamily: Oceanitidae

The southern storm-petrels are relatives of the petrels and are the smallest seabirds. They feed on planktonic crustaceans and small fish picked from the surface, typically while hovering. The flight is fluttering and sometimes bat-like.

 Wilson's storm-petrel, Oceanites oceanicus 
 White-faced storm-petrel, Pelagodroma marina (A)
 Black-bellied storm-petrel, Fregetta tropica (A)

Northern storm-petrels
Order: ProcellariiformesFamily: Hydrobatidae

Though the members of this family are similar in many respects to the southern storm-petrels, including their general appearance and habits, there are enough genetic differences to warrant their placement in a separate family.

 Swinhoe's storm-petrel, Hydrobates monorhis 
 Matsudaira's storm-petrel, Hydrobates matsudairaeShearwaters and petrels
Order: ProcellariiformesFamily: Procellariidae

The procellariids are the main group of medium-sized "true petrels", characterised by united nostrils with medium septum and a long outer functional primary.

 Cape petrel, Daption capense (A)
 Barau's petrel, Pterodroma baraui 
 Galapagos petrel, Pterodroma phaeopygia (A)
 Gould's petrel, Pterodroma leucoptera (A)
 Antarctic prion, Pachyptila desolata (A)
 Slender-billed prion, Pachyptila belcheri (A)
 Bulwer's petrel, Bulweria bulwerii 
 Jouanin's petrel, Bulweria fallax Tahiti petrel, Pseudobulweria rostrata Beck's petrel, Pseudobulweria becki (A)
 Streaked shearwater, Calonectris leucomelas 
 Flesh-footed shearwater, Ardenna carneipes Wedge-tailed shearwater, Ardenna pacificus Sooty shearwater, Ardenna grisea 
 Short-tailed shearwater, Ardenna tenuirostris (A)
 Tropical shearwater, Puffinus bailloni Heinroth's shearwater, Puffinus heinrothi (A)

Storks
Order: CiconiiformesFamily: Ciconiidae

Storks are large, long-legged, long-necked, wading birds with long, stout bills. Storks are virtually mute, but bill-clattering is an important mode of communication at the nest. Their nests can be large and may be reused for many years. Many species are migratory.

 Asian openbill, Anastomus oscitans (A)
 Asian woolly-necked stork, Ciconia episcopus 
 Storm's stork, Ciconia stormi 
 Black-necked stork, Ephippiorhynchus asiaticus 
 Lesser adjutant, Leptoptilos javanicus 
 Greater adjutant, Leptoptilos dubius (Ex)
 Milky stork, Mycteria cinereaFrigatebirds
Order: SuliformesFamily: Fregatidae

Frigatebirds are large seabirds usually found over tropical oceans. They are large, black-and-white, or completely black, with long wings and deeply forked tails. The males have coloured inflatable throat pouches. They do not swim or walk and cannot take off from a flat surface. Having the largest wingspan-to-body-weight ratio of any bird, they are essentially aerial, able to stay aloft for more than a week.

 Lesser frigatebird, Fregata ariel 
 Christmas Island frigatebird, Fregata andrewsi Great frigatebird, Fregata minorBoobies and gannets
Order: SuliformesFamily: Sulidae

The gannets and boobies are medium to large coastal seabirds that plunge-dive for fish.

 Masked booby, Sula dactylatra 
 Brown booby, Sula leucogaster 
 Red-footed booby, Sula sula 
 Abbott's booby, Papasula abbottiAnhingas
Order: SuliformesFamily: Anhingidae

Anhingas or darters are often called "snake-birds" because they have long thin necks, which gives a snake-like appearance when they swim with their bodies submerged. The males have black and dark-brown plumage, an erectile crest on the nape and a larger bill than the female. The females have much paler plumage, especially, on the neck and underparts. The darters have completely webbed feet and their legs are short and set far back on the body. Their plumage is somewhat permeable, like that of cormorants, and they spread their wings to dry after diving.

 Oriental darter, Anhinga melanogaster 
 Australasian darter, Anhinga novaehollandiaeCormorants and shags
Order: SuliformesFamily: Phalacrocoracidae

The Phalacrocoracidae are a family of medium to large fish-eating birds that includes cormorants and shags. Plumage colouration varies; the majority of species have mainly dark plumage, but some are pied black and white, and a few are more colourful.

 Little pied cormorant, Microcarbo melanoleucos Little cormorant, Microcarbo niger Great cormorant, Phalacrocorax carbo Little black cormorant, Phalacrocorax sulcirostrisPelicans
Order: PelecaniformesFamily: Pelecanidae

Pelicans are large water birds with a distinctive pouch under their beak. They have webbed feet with four toes.

 Great white pelican, Pelecanus onocrotalus Australian pelican, Pelecanus conspicillatus 
 Spot-billed pelican, Pelecanus philippensis (A)

Herons, egrets, and bitterns
Order: PelecaniformesFamily: Ardeidae

The family Ardeidae contains the bitterns, herons, and egrets. Herons and egrets are medium to large wading birds with long necks and legs. Bitterns tend to be shorter necked and more wary. Unlike other long-necked birds such as storks, ibises, and spoonbills, members of this family fly with their necks retracted.

 Yellow bittern, Ixobrychus sinensis 
 Black-backed bittern, Ixobrychus dubius Schrenck's bittern, Ixobrychus eurhythmus Cinnamon bittern, Ixobrychus cinnamomeus 
 Black bittern, Ixobrychus flavicollis 
 Forest bittern, Zonerodius heliosylus Gray heron, Ardea cinerea Pacific heron, Ardea pacifica Great-billed heron, Ardea sumatrana 
 Purple heron, Ardea purpurea Great egret, Ardea alba Intermediate egret, Ardea intermedia 
 White-faced heron, Egretta novaehollandiae 
 Chinese egret, Egretta eulophotes Little egret, Egretta garzetta 
 Pacific reef-heron, Egretta sacra Pied heron, Egretta picata 
 Cattle egret, Bubulcus ibis Chinese pond-heron, Ardeola bacchus Javan pond-heron, Ardeola speciosa Striated heron, Butorides striata 
 Black-crowned night-heron, Nycticorax nycticorax Nankeen night-heron, Nycticorax caledonicus Japanese night-heron, Gorsachius goisagi 
 Malayan night-heron, Gorsachius melanolophusIbises and spoonbills
Order: PelecaniformesFamily: Threskiornithidae

Threskiornithidae is a family of large terrestrial and wading birds which comprises the ibises and spoonbills. Its members have long, broad wings with 11 primary and about 20 secondary flight feathers. They are strong fliers and, despite their size and weight, very capable soarers.

 Glossy ibis, Plegadis falcinellus 
 Black-headed ibis, Threskiornis melanocephalus 
 Australian ibis, Threskiornis molucca Straw-necked ibis, Threskiornis spinicollis 
 White-shouldered ibis, Pseudibis davisoni 
 Royal spoonbill, Platalea regia Yellow-billed spoonbill, Platalea flavipes (A)

Osprey
Order: AccipitriformesFamily: Pandionidae

The family Pandionidae contains only one species, the osprey. The osprey is a medium-large raptor which is a specialist fish-eater with a worldwide distribution.

 Osprey, Pandion haliaetusHawks, eagles, and kites
Order: AccipitriformesFamily: Accipitridae

Accipitridae is a family of birds of prey which includes hawks, eagles, kites, harriers, and Old World vultures. These birds mostly have powerful hooked beaks for tearing flesh from their prey, strong legs, powerful talons, and keen eyesight.

 Black-winged kite, Elanus caeruleus 
 Sulawesi honey-buzzard, Pernis celebensis 
 Philippine honey-buzzard, Pernis steerei 
 Oriental honey-buzzard, Pernis ptilorhyncus Long-tailed honey-buzzard, Henicopernis longicauda 
 Jerdon's baza, Aviceda jerdoni Pacific baza, Aviceda subcristata 
 Black baza, Aviceda leuphotes 
 Sulawesi serpent-eagle, Spilornis rufipectus (E)
 Mountain serpent-eagle, Spilornis kinabaluensis 
 Crested serpent eagle, Spilornis cheela 
 Short-toed snake eagle, Circaetus gallicus 
 Bat hawk, Macheiramphus alcinus New Guinea eagle, Harpyopsis novaeguineae 
 Changeable hawk-eagle, Nisaetus cirrhatus 
 Flores hawk-eagle, Nisaetus floris (E)
 Blyth's hawk-eagle, Nisaetus alboniger 
 Javan hawk-eagle, Nisaetus bartelsi (E)
 Sulawesi hawk-eagle, Nisaetus lanceolatus (E)
 Wallace's hawk-eagle, Nisaetus nanus 
 Rufous-bellied eagle, Lophotriorchis kienerii 
 Black eagle, Ictinaetus malaiensis Greater spotted eagle, Clanga clanga (A)
 Booted eagle, Hieraaetus pennatus Pygmy eagle, Hieraaetus weiskei Gurney's eagle, Aquila gurneyi 
 Wedge-tailed eagle, Aquila audax(A) 
 Bonelli's eagle, Aquila fasciata White-eyed buzzard, Butastur teesa (A)
 Rufous-winged buzzard, Butastur liventer 
 Gray-faced buzzard, Butastur indicus Eurasian marsh-harrier, Circus aeruginosus (A)
 Eastern marsh-harrier, Circus spilonotus 
 Papuan marsh-harrier, Circus spilothorax Swamp harrier, Circus approximans 
 Spotted harrier, Circus assimilis 
 Pied harrier, Circus melanoleucos Crested goshawk, Accipiter trivirgatus 
 Sulawesi goshawk, Accipiter griseiceps (E)
 Shikra, Accipiter badius 
 Chinese sparrowhawk, Accipiter soloensis 
 Spot-tailed goshawk, Accipiter trinotatus (E)
 Variable goshawk, Accipiter hiogaster 
 Brown goshawk, Accipiter fasciatus 
 Black-mantled goshawk, Accipiter melanochlamys 
 Moluccan goshawk, Accipiter henicogrammus (E)
 Gray-headed goshawk, Accipiter poliocephalus 
 Japanese sparrowhawk, Accipiter gularis 
 Small sparrowhawk, Accipiter nanus (E)
 Besra, Accipiter virgatus 
 Rufous-necked sparrowhawk, Accipiter erythrauchen (E)
 Collared sparrowhawk, Accipiter cirrocephalus 
 Vinous-breasted sparrowhawk, Accipiter rhodogaster (E)
 Eurasian sparrowhawk, Accipiter nisus (A)
 Meyer's goshawk, Accipiter meyerianus Chestnut-shouldered goshawk, Erythrotriorchis buergersi 
 Doria's goshawk, Megatriorchis doriae Black kite, Milvus migrans Whistling kite, Haliastur sphenurus 
 Brahminy kite, Haliastur indus 
 White-bellied sea-eagle, Haliaeetus leucogaster 
 Lesser fish-eagle, Ichthyophaga humilis 
 Gray-headed fish-eagle, Ichthyophaga ichthyaetus 
 Eastern buzzard, Buteo japonicusBarn-owls
Order: StrigiformesFamily: Tytonidae

Barn-owls are medium to large owls with large heads and characteristic heart-shaped faces. They have long strong legs with powerful talons.

 Sooty owl, Tyto tenebricosa Australian masked-owl, Tyto novaehollandiae Seram masked-owl, Tyto almae (E)
 Lesser masked-owl, Tyto sororcula (E)
 Taliabu masked-owl, Tyto nigrobrunnea (E)
 Minahassa masked-owl, Tyto inexspectata (E)
 Sulawesi masked-owl, Tyto rosenbergii (E)
 Australasian grass-owl, Tyto longimembris Barn owl, Tyto alba Oriental bay-owl, Phodilus badiusOwls
Order: StrigiformesFamily: Strigidae

The typical owls are small to large solitary nocturnal birds of prey. They have large forward-facing eyes and ears, a hawk-like beak, and a conspicuous circle of feathers around each eye called a facial disk.

 White-fronted scops-owl, Otus sagittatus (A)
 Reddish scops-owl, Otus rufescens Flores scops-owl, Otus alfredi (E)
 Mountain scops-owl, Otus spilocephalus Rajah scops-owl, Otus brookii Javan scops-owl, Otus angelinae (E)
 Mentawai scops-owl, Otus mentawi (E)
 Sunda scops-owl, Otus lempiji 
 Wallace's scops-owl, Otus silvicola (E)
 Moluccan scops-owl, Otus magicus 
 Rinjani scops-owl, Otus jolandae (E)
 Sulawesi scops-owl, Otus manadensis (E)
 Banggai scops-owl, Otus mendeni (E)
 Wetar scops-owl, Otus tempestatis (E)
 Sangihe scops-owl, Otus collari (E)
 Siau scops-owl, Otus siaoensis (E)
 Sula scops-owl, Otus sulaensis  (E)
 Biak scops-owl, Otus beccarii (E)
 Simeulue scops-owl, Otus umbra (E)
 Enggano scops-owl, Otus enganensis (E)
 Oriental scops-owl, Otus sunia 
 Barred eagle-owl, Bubo sumatranus Buffy fish-owl, Ketupa ketupu 
 Javan owlet, Glaucidium castanopterum (E)
 Sunda owlet, Taenioptynx sylvaticus (E)
 Spotted wood-owl, Strix seloputo Brown wood-owl, Strix leptogrammica Rufous owl, Ninox rufa 
 Barking owl, Ninox connivens 
 Sumba boobook, Ninox rudolfi (E)
 Southern boobook, Ninox boobook 
 Rote boobook, Ninox rotiensis (E)
 Timor boobook, Ninox fusca (E)
 Alor boobook, Ninox plesseni (E)
 Least boobook, Ninox sumbaensis (E)
 Brown boobook, Ninox scutulata 
 Northern boobook, Ninox japonica Chocolate boobook, Ninox randi Ochre-bellied boobook, Ninox ochracea (E)
 Togian boobook, Ninox burhani (E)
 Cinnabar boobook, Ninox ios (E)
 Halmahera boobook, Ninox hypogramma (E)
 Tanimbar boobook, Ninox forbesi (E)
 Seram boobook, Ninox squamipila 
 Buru boobook, Ninox hantu Papuan boobook, Ninox theomacha 
 Speckled boobook, Ninox punctulata (E)
 Papuan owl, Uroglaux dimorpha 

Trogons
Order: TrogoniformesFamily: Trogonidae

The family Trogonidae includes the trogons and quetzals. Found in tropical woodlands worldwide, they feed on insects and fruit, and their broad bills and weak legs reflect their diet and arboreal habits. Although their flight is fast, they are reluctant to fly any distance. Trogons have soft, often colourful, feathers with distinctive male and female plumage.

 Javan trogon, Harpactes reinwardtii (E)
 Sumatran trogon, Harpactes mackloti (E)
 Red-naped trogon, Harpactes kasumba 
 Diard's trogon, Harpactes diardii 
 Whitehead's trogon, Harpactes whiteheadi 
 Cinnamon-rumped trogon, Harpactes orrhophaeus 
 Scarlet-rumped trogon, Harpactes duvaucelii 
 Red-headed trogon, Harpactes erythrocephalus Orange-breasted trogon, Harpactes oreskiosHoopoes
Order: BucerotiformesFamily: Upupidae

Hoopoes have black, white, and pink plumage and a large erectile crest on the head.

 Eurasian hoopoe, Upupa epopsHornbills
Order: BucerotiformesFamily: Bucerotidae

Hornbills are a group of birds whose bill is shaped like a cow's horn, but without a twist, sometimes with a casque on the upper mandible. Frequently, the bill is brightly coloured.

 White-crowned hornbill, Berenicornis comatus Helmeted hornbill, Buceros vigil 
 Rhinoceros hornbill, Buceros rhinoceros 
 Great hornbill, Buceros bicornis Bushy-crested hornbill, Anorrhinus galeritus 
 Black hornbill, Anthracoceros malayanus 
 Oriental pied-hornbill, Anthracoceros albirostris 
 Knobbed hornbill, Rhyticeros cassidix (E)
 Sumba hornbill, Rhyticeros everetti (E)
 Wreathed hornbill, Rhyticeros undulatus 
 Blyth's hornbill, Rhyticeros plicatus 
 Sulawesi hornbill, Rhabdotorrhinus exarhatus (E)
 Wrinkled hornbill, Rhabdotorrhinus corrugatusKingfishers
Order: CoraciiformesFamily: Alcedinidae

Kingfishers are medium-sized birds with large heads, long, pointed bills, short legs, and stubby tails.

 Common kingfisher, Alcedo atthis 
 Blue-eared kingfisher, Alcedo meninting 
 Javan blue-banded kingfisher, Alcedo euryzona (E)
 Malaysian blue-banded kingfisher, Alcedo peninsulae 
 Small blue kingfisher, Alcedo coerulescens (E)
 Azure kingfisher, Ceyx azureus 
 Little kingfisher, Ceyx pusillus 
 Black-backed dwarf-kingfisher, Ceyx erithaca Rufous-backed dwarf-kingfisher, Ceyx rufidorsa Sulawesi dwarf-kingfisher, Ceyx fallax (E)
 Sangihe dwarf-kingfisher, Ceyx sangirensis (E)
 Sula dwarf-kingfisher, Ceyx wallacii (E)
 Moluccan dwarf-kingfisher, Ceyx lepidus (E)
 Buru dwarf-kingfisher, Ceyx cajeli (E)
 Papuan dwarf-kingfisher, Ceyx solitarius Banded kingfisher, Lacedo pulchella 
 Blue-winged kookaburra, Dacelo leachii Spangled kookaburra, Dacelo tyro 
 Rufous-bellied kookaburra, Dacelo gaudichaud 
 Shovel-billed kookaburra, Clytoceyx rex Sulawesi lilac kingfisher, Cittura cyanotis (E)
 Sangihe lilac kingfisher, Cittura sanghirensis (E)
 Stork-billed kingfisher, Pelargopsis capensis 
 Great-billed kingfisher, Pelargopsis melanorhyncha (E)
 Ruddy kingfisher, Halcyon coromanda 
 White-throated kingfisher, Halcyon smyrnensis 
 Black-capped kingfisher, Halcyon pileata 
 Javan kingfisher, Halcyon cyanoventris (E)
 Blue-black kingfisher, Todirhamphus nigrocyaneus 
 Blue-and-white kingfisher, Todirhamphus diops (E) 
 Lazuli kingfisher, Todirhamphus lazuli (E)
 Forest kingfisher, Todirhamphus macleayii 
 Torresian kingfisher, Todirhamphus sordidus 
 Sacred kingfisher, Todirhamphus sanctus Collared kingfisher, Todirhamphus chloris Beach kingfisher, Todirhamphus saurophagus 
 Sombre kingfisher, Todirhamphus funebris (E)
 Talaud kingfisher, Todirhamphus enigma (E) 
 Cinnamon-banded kingfisher, Todirhamphus australasia (E)
 White-rumped kingfisher, Caridonax fulgidus (E)
 Hook-billed kingfisher, Melidora macrorrhina 
 Rufous-collared kingfisher, Actenoides concretus 
 Green-backed kingfisher, Actenoides monachus (E)
 Scaly-breasted kingfisher, Actenoides princeps (E)
 Yellow-billed kingfisher, Syma torotoro 
 Mountain kingfisher, Syma megarhyncha 
 Little paradise-kingfisher, Tanysiptera hydrocharis 
 Common paradise-kingfisher, Tanysiptera galatea 
 Kofiau paradise-kingfisher, Tanysiptera ellioti (E)
 Biak paradise-kingfisher, Tanysiptera riedelii (E)
 Numfor paradise-kingfisher, Tanysiptera carolinae (E)
 Red-breasted paradise-kingfisher, Tanysiptera nympha Buff-breasted paradise-kingfisher, Tanysiptera sylviaBee-eaters
Order: CoraciiformesFamily: Meropidae

The bee-eaters are a group of near passerine birds. Most species are found in Africa but others occur in southern Europe, southern Asia, Australia and New Guinea. They are characterised by richly coloured plumage, slender bodies, and usually elongated central tail feathers. All are colourful and have long down-turned bills and pointed wings, which give them a swallow-like appearance when seen from afar.

 Red-bearded bee-eater, Nyctyornis amictus 
 Purple-bearded bee-eater, Meropogon forsteni (E)
 Blue-throated bee-eater, Merops viridis 
 Blue-tailed bee-eater, Merops philippinus 
 Rainbow bee-eater, Merops ornatus 
 Chestnut-headed bee-eater, Merops leschenaultiRollers
Order: CoraciiformesFamily: Coraciidae

Rollers resemble crows in size and build, but are more closely related to the kingfishers and bee-eaters. They share the colourful appearance of those groups with blues and browns predominating. The two inner front toes are connected, but the outer toe is not.

 Purple-winged roller, Coracias temminckii (E)
 Dollarbird, Eurystomus orientalis Azure roller, Eurystomus azureus (E)

Asian barbets
Order: PiciformesFamily: Megalaimidae

The Asian barbets are plump birds, with short necks and large heads. They get their name from the bristles which fringe their heavy bills. Most species are brightly coloured.

 Sooty barbet, Caloramphus hayii 
 Brown barbet, Caloramphus fuliginosus Coppersmith barbet, Psilopogon haemacephalus Blue-eared barbet, Psilopogon duvaucelii 
 Little barbet, Psilopogon australis 
 Bornean barbet, Psilopogon eximius 
 Fire-tufted barbet, Psilopogon pyrolophus Red-crowned barbet, Psilopogon rafflesii 
 Red-throated barbet, Psilopogon mystacophanos Black-banded barbet, Psilopogon javensis (E)
 Golden-naped barbet, Psilopogon pulcherrimus 
 Yellow-crowned barbet, Psilopogon henricii 
 Flame-fronted barbet, Psilopogon armillaris (E) 
 Lineated barbet, Psilopogon lineatus Mountain barbet, Psilopogon monticola 
 Brown-throated barbet, Psilopogon corvinus (E)
 Gold-whiskered barbet, Psilopogon chrysopogon 
 Black-browed barbet, Psilopogon oorti 

Honeyguides
Order: PiciformesFamily: Indicatoridae

Honeyguides are among the few birds that feed on wax. They are named for the greater honeyguide which leads traditional honey-hunters to bees' nests and, after the hunters have harvested the honey, feeds on the remaining contents of the hive.

 Malaysian honeyguide, Indicator archipelagicusWoodpeckers
Order: PiciformesFamily: Picidae

Woodpeckers are small to medium-sized birds with chisel-like beaks, short legs, stiff tails, and long tongues used for capturing insects. Some species have feet with two toes pointing forward and two backward, while several species have only three toes. Many woodpeckers have the habit of tapping noisily on tree trunks with their beaks.

 Speckled piculet, Picumnus innominatus 
 Rufous piculet, Sasia abnormis 
 Gray-and-buff woodpecker, Hemicircus concretus Sulawesi pygmy woodpecker, Yungipicus temminckii (E)
 Sunda pygmy woodpecker, Yungipicus moluccensis Gray-capped pygmy woodpecker, Yungipicus canicapillus 
 Freckle-breasted woodpecker, Dendrocopos analis 
 Maroon woodpecker, Blythipicus rubiginosus 
 Orange-backed woodpecker, Reinwardtipicus validus 
 Greater flameback, Chrysocolaptes guttacristatus 
 Javan flameback, Chrysocolaptes strictus 
 Rufous woodpecker, Micropternus brachyurus Buff-necked woodpecker, Meiglyptes tukki 
 Buff-rumped woodpecker, Meiglyptes tristis 
 Olive-backed woodpecker, Dinopium rafflesii 
 Common flameback, Dinopium javanense 
 Lesser yellownape, Picus chlorolophus Crimson-winged woodpecker, Picus puniceus 
 Laced woodpecker, Picus vittatus 
 Gray-headed woodpecker, Picus canus Banded woodpecker, Chrysophlegma miniaceum 
 Greater yellownape, Chrysophlegma flavinucha 
 Checker-throated woodpecker, Chrysophlegma mentale 
 Ashy woodpecker, Mulleripicus fulvus (E)
 Great slaty woodpecker, Mulleripicus pulverulentus 
 White-bellied woodpecker, Dryocopus javensis 

Falcons and caracaras
Order: FalconiformesFamily: Falconidae

Falconidae is a family of diurnal birds of prey. They differ from hawks, eagles, and kites in that they kill with their beaks instead of their talons.

 Black-thighed falconet, Microhierax fringillarius 
 White-fronted falconet, Microhierax latifrons Eurasian kestrel, Falco tinnunculus (A)
 Spotted kestrel, Falco moluccensis (E)
 Nankeen kestrel, Falco cenchroides Eurasian hobby, Falco subbuteo (A)
 Oriental hobby, Falco severus Australian hobby, Falco longipennis Brown falcon, Falco berigora 
 Peregrine falcon, Falco peregrinusCockatoos
Order: PsittaciformesFamily: Cacatuidae

The cockatoos share many features with other parrots including the characteristic curved beak shape and a zygodactyl foot, with two forward toes and two backwards toes. They differ, however in a number of characteristics, including the often spectacular movable headcrest.

 Palm cockatoo, Probosciger aterrimus 
 Little corella, Cacatua sanguinea 
 Tanimbar cockatoo, Cacatua goffiniana (E)
 Yellow-crested cockatoo, Cacatua sulphurea 
 Sulphur-crested cockatoo, Cacatua galerita 
 Salmon-crested cockatoo, Cacatua moluccensis (E)
 White cockatoo, Cacatua alba (E)

Old World parrots
Order: PsittaciformesFamily: Psittaculidae

Characteristic features of parrots include a strong curved bill, an upright stance, strong legs, and clawed zygodactyl feet. Many parrots are vividly coloured, and some are multi-coloured. Old World parrots are found from Africa east across south and southeast Asia and Oceania to Australia and New Zealand.

 Pesquet's parrot, Psittrichas fulgidus 
 Yellow-capped pygmy-parrot, Micropsitta keiensis 
 Geelvink pygmy-parrot, Micropsitta geelvinkiana (E)
 Buff-faced pygmy-parrot, Micropsitta pusio 
 Red-breasted pygmy-parrot, Micropsitta bruijnii 
 Moluccan king-parrot, Alisterus amboinensis (E)
 Papuan king-parrot, Alisterus chloropterus 
 Olive-shouldered parrot, Aprosmictus jonquillaceus (E)
 Red-winged parrot, Aprosmictus erythropterus 
 Buru racquet-tail, Prioniturus mada (E)
 Golden-mantled racquet-tail, Prioniturus platurus (E)
 Yellow-breasted racquet-tail, Prioniturus flavicans (E)
 Eclectus parrot, Eclectus roratus 
 Red-cheeked parrot, Geoffroyus geoffroyi 
 Blue-collared parrot, Geoffroyus simplex 
 Blue-rumped parrot, Psittinus cyanurus Rose-ringed parakeet, Psittacula krameri (A)
 Red-breasted parakeet, Psittacula alexandri 
 Long-tailed parakeet, Psittacula longicauda 
 Painted tiger-parrot, Psittacella picta 
 Brehm's tiger-parrot, Psittacella brehmii 
 Modest tiger-parrot, Psittacella modesta Madarasz's tiger-parrot, Psittacella madaraszi 
 Black-lored parrot, Tanygnathus gramineus (E)
 Great-billed parrot, Tanygnathus megalorynchos 
 Blue-naped parrot, Tanygnathus lucionensis 
 Azure-rumped parrot, Tanygnathus sumatranus 
 Orange-breasted fig-parrot, Cyclopsitta gulielmitertii 
 Double-eyed fig-parrot, Cyclopsitta diophthalma Large fig-parrot, Psittaculirostris desmarestii 
 Edwards's fig-parrot, Psittaculirostris edwardsii 
 Salvadori's fig-parrot, Psittaculirostris salvadorii (E)
 Plum-faced lorikeet, Oreopsittacus arfaki 
 Pygmy lorikeet, Charminetta wilhelminae Red-fronted lorikeet, Hypocharmosyna rubronotata Red-flanked lorikeet, Hypocharmosyna placentis Blue-fronted lorikeet, Charmosynopsis toxopei (E)
 Fairy lorikeet, Charmosynopsis pulchella 
 Striated lorikeet, Synorhacma multistriata 
 Josephine's lorikeet, Charmosyna josefinae 
 Papuan lorikeet, Charmosyna papou 
 Yellow-billed lorikeet, Neopsittacus musschenbroekii'
 Orange-billed lorikeet, Neopsittacus pullicauda
 Chattering lory, Lorius garrulus (E)
 Purple-naped lory, Lorius domicella (E)
 Black-capped lory, Lorius lory 
 Dusky lory, Pseudeos fuscata
 Brown lory, Chalcopsitta duivenbodei 
 Black lory, Chalcopsitta atra
 Yellow-streaked lory, Chalcopsitta scintillata 
 Goldie's lorikeet, Glossoptila goldiei
 Iris lorikeet, Saudareos iris (E)
 Ornate lorikeet, Saudareos ornatus (E)
 Yellow-cheeked lorikeet, Saudareos meyeri (E)
 Sula lorikeet, Saudareos flavoviridis (E)
 Blue-streaked lory, Eos reticulata (E) 
 Blue-eared lory, Eos semilarvata (E) 
 Red lory, Eos bornea (E)
 Black-winged lory, Eos cyanogenia (E) 
 Red-and-blue lory, Eos histrio (E)
 Violet-necked lory, Eos squamata (E)
 Coconut lorikeet, Trichoglossus haematodus
 Red-collared lorikeet, Trichoglossus rubritorquis
 Olive-headed lorikeet, Trichoglossus euteles (E)
 Marigold lorikeet, Trichoglossus capistratus (E)
 Leaf lorikeet, Trichoglossus weberi (E)
 Sunset lorikeet, Trichoglossus forsteni 
 Blue-crowned hanging-parrot, Loriculus galgulus
 Sulawesi hanging-parrot, Loriculus stigmatus (E)
 Sula hanging-parrot, Loriculus sclateri (E)
 Moluccan hanging-parrot, Loriculus amabilis 
 Sangihe hanging-parrot, Loriculus catamene (E)
 Papuan hanging-parrot, Loriculus aurantiifrons 
 Pygmy hanging-parrot, Loriculus exilis (E)
 Yellow-throated hanging-parrot, Loriculus pusillus (E)
 Wallace's hanging-parrot, Loriculus flosculus (E)

African and green broadbills
Order: PasseriformesFamily: Calyptomenidae

The broadbills are small, brightly coloured birds which feed on fruit and also take insects in flycatcher fashion, snapping their broad bills. Their habitat is canopies of wet forests.

 Green broadbill, Calyptomena viridis
 Hose's broadbill, Calyptomena hosii 
 Whitehead's broadbill, Calyptomena whiteheadi

Asian and Grauer’s broadbills
Order: PasseriformesFamily: Eurylaimidae

The broadbills are small, brightly coloured birds, which feed on fruit and also take insects in flycatcher fashion, snapping their broad bills. Their habitat is canopies of wet fore

 Long-tailed broadbill, Psarisomus dalhousiae
 Dusky broadbill, Corydon sumatranus
 Silver-breasted broadbill, Serilophus lunatus
 Black-and-red broadbill, Cymbirhynchus macrorhynchos 
 Banded broadbill, Eurylaimus javanicus 
 Black-and-yellow broadbill, Eurylaimus ochromalus

Pittas
Order: PasseriformesFamily: Pittidae

Pittas are medium-sized stocky passerines with fairly long, strong legs, short tails, and stout bills. Many are brightly coloured. They spend the majority of their time on wet forest floors, eating snails, insects, and similar invertebrate prey.

 Blue-breasted pitta, Erythropitta erythrogaster
 Sangihe pitta, Erythropitta caeruleitorques (E)
 Siau pitta, Erythropitta palliceps 
 Sulawesi pitta, Erythropitta celebensis (E)
 Sula pitta, Erythropitta dohertyi (E)
 North Moluccan pitta, Erythropitta rufiventris 
 South Moluccan pitta, Erythropitta rubrinucha 
 Papuan pitta, Erythropitta macklotii 
 Graceful pitta, Erythropitta venusta
 Blue-banded pitta, Erythropitta arquata 
 Garnet pitta, Erythropitta granatina
 Giant pitta, Hydrornis caeruleus
 Schneider's pitta, Hydrornis schneideri (E)
 Malayan banded-pitta, Hydrornis irena
 Javan banded-pitta, Hydrornis guajanus 
 Bornean banded-pitta, Hydrornis schwaneri 
 Blue-headed pitta, Hydrornis baudii
 Blue-winged pitta, Pitta moluccensis
 Fairy pitta, Pitta nympha 
 Hooded pitta, Pitta sordida
 Noisy pitta, Pitta versicolor 
 Ivory-breasted pitta, Pitta maxima (E)
 Ornate pitta, Pitta concinna 
 Elegant pitta, Pitta elegans 
 Banda Sea pitta, Pitta vigorsii 
 Mangrove pitta, Pitta megarhyncha

Bowerbirds
Order: PasseriformesFamily: Ptilonorhynchidae

The bowerbirds are small to medium-sized passerine birds. The males notably build a bower to attract a mate. Depending on the species, the bower ranges from a circle of cleared earth with a small pile of twigs in the center to a complex and highly decorated structure of sticks and leaves.

 White-eared catbird, Ailuroedus buccoides 
 Ochre-breasted catbird, Ailuroedus stonii
 Tan-capped catbird, Ailuroedus geislerorum
 Northern catbird, Ailuroedus jobiensis
 Arfak catbird, Ailuroedus arfakianus 
 Black-eared catbird, Ailuroedus melanotis
 Archbold's bowerbird, Archboldia papuensis 
 Vogelkop bowerbird, Amblyornis inornata (E) 
 MacGregor's bowerbird, Amblyornis macgregoriae 
 Golden-fronted bowerbird, Amblyornis flavifrons (E)
 Masked bowerbird, Sericulus aureus 
 Flame bowerbird, Sericulus ardens
 Yellow-breasted bowerbird, Chlamydera lauterbachi 
 Fawn-breasted bowerbird, Chlamydera cerviniventris

Australasian treecreepers
Order: PasseriformesFamily: Climacteridae

The Climacteridae are medium-small, mostly brown-coloured birds with patterning on their underparts. They are endemic to Australia and New Guinea.

 Papuan treecreeper, Cormobates placens

Fairywrens
Order: PasseriformesFamily: Maluridae

Maluridae is a family of small, insectivorous passerine birds endemic to Australia and New Guinea. They are socially monogamous and sexually promiscuous, meaning that although they form pairs between one male and one female, each partner will mate with other individuals and even assist in raising the young from such pairings.

 Wallace's fairywren, Sipodotus wallacii 
 Orange-crowned fairywren, Clytomyias insignis 
 Broad-billed fairywren, Chenorhamphus grayi
 Emperor fairywren, Malurus cyanocephalus 
 White-shouldered fairywren, Malurus alboscapulatus

Honeyeaters
Order: PasseriformesFamily: Meliphagidae

The honeyeaters are a large and diverse family of small to medium-sized birds most common in Australia and New Guinea. They are nectar feeders and closely resemble other nectar-feeding passerines.

 Dark-eared myza, Myza celebensis (E) 
 White-eared myza, Myza sarasinorum (E)
 Plain honeyeater, Pycnopygius ixoides 
 Marbled honeyeater, Pycnopygius cinereus
 Streak-headed honeyeater, Pycnopygius stictocephalus 
 Puff-backed honeyeater, Meliphaga aruensis
 Streak-breasted honeyeater, Territornis reticulata (E)
 Orange-cheeked honeyeater, Oreornis chrysogenys (E)
 Forest honeyeater, Microptilotis montanus 
 Mottled honeyeater, Microptilotis mimikae
 Yellow-gaped honeyeater, Microptilotis flavirictus 
 Mountain honeyeater, Microptilotis orientalis 
 Scrub honeyeater, Microptilotis albonotatus 
 Mimic honeyeater, Microptilotis analogus 
 Graceful honeyeater, Microptilotis gracilis
 Black-throated honeyeater, Caligavis subfrenata 
 Obscure honeyeater, Caligavis obscura
 Sooty melidectes, Melidectes fuscus
 Short-bearded melidectes, Melidectes nouhuysi (E)
 Ornate melidectes, Melidectes torquatus 
 Cinnamon-browed melidectes, Melidectes ochromelas
 Vogelkop melidectes, Melidectes leucostephes (E)
 Belford's melidectes, Melidectes belfordi 
 Yellow-browed melidectes, Melidectes rufocrissalis 
 Varied honeyeater, Gavicalis versicolor
 Brown-backed honeyeater, Ramsayornis modestus 
 Rufous-banded honeyeater, Conopophila albogularis 
 Arfak honeyeater, Melipotes gymnops (E)
 Smoky honeyeater, Melipotes fumigatus 
 Foja honeyeater, Melipotes carolae (E)
 Macgregor's honeyeater, Macgregoria pulchra
 Long-billed honeyeater, Melilestes megarhynchus 
 Olive straightbill, Timeliopsis fulvigula 
 Tawny straightbill, Timeliopsis griseigula
 Seram myzomela, Myzomela blasii (E)
 Ruby-throated myzomela, Myzomela eques 
 Dusky myzomela, Myzomela obscura 
 Red myzomela, Myzomela cruentata
 Papuan black myzomela, Myzomela nigrita
 Alor myzomela, Myzomela prawiradilagae (E)
 Crimson-hooded myzomela, Myzomela kuehni (E)
 Red-headed myzomela, Myzomela erythrocephala 
 Sumba myzomela, Myzomela dammermani (E)
 Rote myzomela, Myzomela irianawidodoae (E)
 Elfin myzomela, Myzomela adolphinae 
 Sulawesi myzomela, Myzomela chloroptera (E)
 Taliabu myzomela, Myzomela wahe (E)
 Wakolo myzomela, Myzomela wakoloensis (E)
 Banda myzomela, Myzomela boiei (E)
 Black-breasted myzomela, Myzomela vulnerata (E)
 Red-collared myzomela, Myzomela rosenbergii 
 Green-backed honeyeater, Glycichaera fallax 
 Leaden honeyeater, Ptiloprora plumbea 
 Yellow-streaked honeyeater, Ptiloprora meekiana 
 Rufous-sided honeyeater, Ptiloprora erythropleura (E)
 Mayr's honeyeater, Ptiloprora mayri
 Gray-streaked honeyeater, Ptiloprora perstriata 
 Sunda honeyeater, Lichmera lombokia (E)
 Olive honeyeater, Lichmera argentauris (E)
 Brown honeyeater, Lichmera indistincta
 White-tufted honeyeater, Lichmera squamata (E)
 Silver-eared honeyeater, Lichmera alboauricularis 
 Buru honeyeater, Lichmera deningeri (E)
 Seram honeyeater, Lichmera monticola (E)
 Yellow-eared honeyeater, Lichmera flavicans (E)
 Black-chested honeyeater, Lichmera notabilis (E)
 Blue-faced honeyeater, Entomyzon cyanotis
 White-throated honeyeater, Melithreptus albogularis 
 Tawny-breasted honeyeater, Xanthotis flaviventer 
 Spotted honeyeater, Xanthotis polygrammus 
 White-streaked friarbird, Melitograis gilolensis (E)
 Little friarbird, Philemon citreogularis 
 Meyer's friarbird, Philemon meyeri 
 Timor friarbird, Philemon inornatus (E)
 Gray friarbird, Philemon kisserensis (E) 
 Brass's friarbird, Philemon brassi (E) 
 Dusky friarbird, Philemon fuscicapillus (E) 
 Buru friarbird, Philemon moluccensis (E)
 Tanimbar friarbird, Philemon plumigenis (E)
 Seram friarbird, Philemon subcorniculatus (E)
 Helmeted friarbird, Philemon buceroides 
 Noisy friarbird, Philemon corniculatus

Thornbills and allies
Order: PasseriformesFamily: Acanthizidae

The Acanthizidae are small- to medium-sized birds with short rounded wings, slender bills, long legs, and a short tail. The golden-bellied gerygone is the only member of the family found in mainland Asia.

 Goldenface, Pachycare flavogrisea 
 Rusty mouse-warbler, Crateroscelis murina 
 Bicolored mouse-warbler, Crateroscelis nigrorufa 
 Mountain mouse-warbler, Crateroscelis robusta 
 Tropical scrubwren, Sericornis beccarii
 Large scrubwren, Sericornis nouhuysi
 Vogelkop scrubwren, Sericornis rufescens (E)
 Buff-faced scrubwren, Sericornis perspicillatus
 Papuan scrubwren, Sericornis papuensis
 Gray-green scrubwren, Sericornis arfakianus 
 Pale-billed scrubwren, Sericornis spilodera
 Papuan thornbill, Acanthiza murina
 Gray thornbill, Acanthiza cinerea 
 Green-backed gerygone, Gerygone chloronota 
 Fairy gerygone, Gerygone palpebrosa
 Biak gerygone, Gerygone hypoxantha 
 Yellow-bellied gerygone, Gerygone chrysogaster
 Large-billed gerygone, Gerygone magnirostris 
 Golden-bellied gerygone, Gerygone sulphurea 
 Plain gerygone, Gerygone inornata (E)
 Rufous-sided gerygone, Gerygone dorsalis 
 Brown-breasted gerygone, Gerygone ruficollis
 Mangrove gerygone, Gerygone levigaster

Pseudo-babblers
Order: PasseriformesFamily: Pomatostomidae

The pseudo-babblers are small to medium-sized birds endemic to Australia and New Guinea. They are ground-feeding omnivores and highly social.

 Papuan babbler, Pomatostomus isidorei
 Gray-crowned babbler, Pomatostomus temporalis

Logrunners
Order: PasseriformesFamily: Orthonychidae

The Orthonychidae is a family of birds with a single genus, Orthonyx, which comprises two types of passerine birds endemic to Australia and New Guinea, the logrunners and the chowchilla. Both use stiffened tails to brace themselves when feeding.

 Papuan logrunner, Orthonyx novaeguineae

Quail-thrushes and jewel-babblers
Order: PasseriformesFamily: Cinclosomatidae

The Cinclosomatidae is a family containing jewel-babblers and quail-thrushes.

 Painted quail-thrush, Cinclosoma ajax
 Spotted jewel-babbler, Ptilorrhoa leucosticta 
 Blue jewel-babbler, Ptilorrhoa caerulescens 
 Dimorphic jewel-babbler, Ptilorrhoa geislerorum (A)
 Chestnut-backed jewel-babbler, Ptilorrhoa castanonota

Cuckooshrikes
Order: PasseriformesFamily: Campephagidae

The cuckooshrikes are small to medium-sized passerine birds. They are predominantly greyish with white and black, although some minivet species are brightly coloured.

 Fiery minivet, Pericrocotus igneus 
 Small minivet, Pericrocotus cinnamomeus 
 Gray-chinned minivet, Pericrocotus solaris 
 Sunda minivet, Pericrocotus miniatus (E)
 Flores minivet, Pericrocotus lansbergei (E)
 Scarlet minivet, Pericrocotus speciosus 
 Ashy minivet, Pericrocotus divaricatus 
 Stout-billed cuckooshrike, Coracina caeruleogrisea
 Hooded cuckooshrike, Coracina longicauda 
 Pied cuckooshrike, Coracina bicolor (E)
 Cerulean cuckooshrike, Coracina temminckii (E)
 Barred cuckooshrike, Coracina lineata 
 Boyer's cuckooshrike, Coracina boyeri 
 Black-faced cuckooshrike, Coracina novaehollandiae 
 White-bellied cuckooshrike, Coracina papuensis 
 Moluccan cuckooshrike, Coracina atriceps (E)
 Bar-bellied cuckooshrike, Coracina striata 
 Sunda cuckooshrike, Coracina larvata (E)
 Javan cuckooshrike, Coracina javensis
 Wallacean cuckooshrike, Coracina personata (E)
 Buru cuckooshrike, Coracina fortis (E)
 White-rumped cuckooshrike, Coracina leucopygia (E)
 Slaty cuckooshrike, Coracina schistacea (E)
 Golden cuckooshrike, Campochaera sloetii
 White-shouldered triller, Lalage sueurii (E)
 Black-browed triller, Lalage atrovirens
 White-browed triller, Lalage moesta (E)
 Varied triller, Lalage leucomela 
 White-rumped triller, Lalage leucopygialis (E)
 Pied triller, Lalage nigra 
 Rufous-bellied triller, Lalage aurea (E)
 Lesser cuckooshrike, Lalage fimbriata
 Pygmy cuckooshrike, Celebesica abbotti (E)
 Halmahera cuckooshrike, Celebesia parvula (E)
 Black-bellied cicadabird, Edolisoma montanum 
 Pale cicadabird, Edolisoma ceramense (E)
 Kai cicadabird, Edolisoma dispar (E)
 Pale-shouldered cicadabird, Edolisoma dohertyi (E)
 Papuan cicadabird, Edolisoma incertum
 Sulawesi cicadabird, Edolisoma morio (E)
 Sula cicadabird, Edolisoma sula (E)
 Common cicadabird, Edolisoma tenuirostre 
 Gray-headed cicadabird, Edolisoma schisticeps 
 Black cicadabird, Edolisoma melas

Sittellas
Order: PasseriformesFamily: Neosittidae

The sittellas are a family of small passerine birds. They resemble treecreepers, but have soft tails.

 Black sittella, Daphoenositta miranda 
 Papuan sittella, Daphoenositta papuensis

Whipbirds and wedgebills
Order: PasseriformesFamily: Psophodidae

The Psophodidae is a family containing whipbirds and wedgebills.

 Papuan whipbird, Androphobus viridis (E)

Ploughbill
Order: PasseriformesFamily: Eulacestomidae

The wattled ploughbill was long thought to be related to the whistlers (Pachycephalidae), and shriketits (formerly Pachycephalidae, now often treated as its own family).

 Wattled ploughbill, Eulacestoma nigropectus

Australo-Papuan bellbirds
Order: PasseriformesFamily: Oreoicidae

The three species contained in the family have been moved around between different families for fifty years. A series of studies of the DNA of Australian birds between 2006 and 2001 found strong support for treating the three genera as a new family, which was formally named in 2016.

 Rufous-naped bellbird, Aleadryas rufinucha 
 Piping bellbird, Ornorectes cristatus

Tit berrypecker and crested berrypecker
Order: PasseriformesFamily: Paramythiidae

Paramythiidae is a very small bird family restricted to the mountain forests of New Guinea. The two species are colourful medium-sized birds which feed on fruit and some insects.

 Tit berrypecker, Oreocharis arfaki 
 Crested berrypecker, Paramythia montium

Vireos, shrike-babblers, and erpornis
Order: PasseriformesFamily: Vireonidae

Most of the members of this family are found in the New World. However, the shrike-babblers and erpornis, which only slightly resemble the "true" vireos and greenlets, are found in South East Asia.

 Pied shrike-babbler, Pteruthius flaviscapis (E)
 White-browed shrike-babbler, Pteruthius aeralatus
 Trilling shrike-babbler, Pteruthius aenobarbus (E)
 White-bellied erpornis, Erpornis zantholeuca

Whistlers and allies
Order: PasseriformesFamily: Pachycephalidae

The family Pachycephalidae includes the whistlers, shrikethrushes, and some of the pitohuis.

 Rusty pitohui, Pseudorectes ferrugineus
 White-bellied pitohui, Pseudorectes incertus
 Gray shrikethrush, Colluricincla harmonica 
 Sooty shrikethrush, Colluricincla tenebrosa
 Waigeo shrikethrush, Colluricincla affinis (E)
 Mamberamo shrikethrush, Colluricincla obscura 
 Sepik-Ramu shrikethrush, Colluricincla tappenbecki 
 Arafura shrikethrush, Colluricincla megarhyncha
 Rufous shrikethrush, Colluricincla rufogaster
 Black pitohui, Melanorectes nigrescens 
 Sangihe whistler, Coracornis sanghirensis (E)
 Maroon-backed whistler, Coracornis raveni (E)
 Bare-throated whistler, Pachycephala nudigula (E)
 Fawn-breasted whistler, Pachycephala orpheus (E)
 Regent whistler, Pachycephala schlegelii 
 Vogelkop whistler, Pachycephala meyeri (E)
 Sclater's whistler, Pachycephala soror
 Rusty-breasted whistler, Pachycephala fulvotincta 
 Yellow-throated whistler, Pachycephala macrorhyncha 
 Black-chinned whistler, Pachycephala mentalis 
 Baliem whistler, Pachycephala balim
 Black-tailed whistler, Pachycephala melanura
 Lorentz's whistler, Pachycephala lorentzi 
 Golden-backed whistler, Pachycephala aurea 
 Bornean whistler, Pachycephala hypoxantha 
 Sulphur-bellied whistler, Pachycephala sulfuriventer (E)
 Mangrove whistler, Pachycephala cinerea 
 Island whistler, Pachycephala phaionota (E)
 Biak whistler, Pachycephala melanorhyncha (E)
 Rusty whistler, Pachycephala hyperythra 
 Gray whistler, Pachycephala simplex 
 Wallacean whistler, Pachycephala arctitorquis (E)
 Drab whistler, Pachycephala griseonota (E)
 White-bellied whistler, Pachycephala leucogastra 
 Black-headed whistler, Pachycephala monacha

Old World orioles
Order: PasseriformesFamily: Oriolidae

The Old World orioles are colourful passerine birds which are not closely related to the New World orioles.

 Hooded pitohui, Pitohui dichrous
 Raja Ampat pitohui, Pitohui cerviniventris 
 Northern variable pitohui, Pitohui kirhocephalus 
 Southern variable pitohui, Pitohui uropygialis 
 Timor oriole, Oriolus melanotis (E)
 Buru oriole, Oriolus bouroensis (E)
 Tanimbar oriole, Oriolus decipiens (E)
 Seram oriole, Oriolus forsteni (E)
 Halmahera oriole, Oriolus phaeochromus (E)
 Brown oriole, Oriolus szalayi 
 Olive-backed oriole, Oriolus sagittatus 
 Green oriole, Oriolus flavocinctus 
 Dark-throated oriole, Oriolus xanthonotus
 Black-naped oriole, Oriolus chinensis
 Black-hooded oriole, Oriolus xanthornus 
 Black oriole, Oriolus hosii 
 Black-and-crimson oriole, Oriolus cruentus
 Wetar figbird, Sphecotheres hypoleucus (E)
 Green figbird, Sphecotheres viridis (E)
 Australasian figbird, Sphecotheres vieilloti

Boatbills
Order: PasseriformesFamily: Machaerirhynchidae

The boatbills have affinities to woodswallows and butcherbirds, and are distributed across New Guinea and northern Queensland.

 Black-breasted boatbill, Machaerirhynchus nigripectus 
 Yellow-breasted boatbill, Machaerirhynchus flaviventer

Woodswallows, bellmagpies and allies 
Order: PasseriformesFamily: Artamidae

The woodswallows are soft-plumaged, somber-coloured passerine birds. They are smooth, agile flyers with moderately large, semi-triangular wings. The cracticids: currawongs, bellmagpies and butcherbirds, are similar to the other corvids. They have large, straight bills and mostly black, white or grey plumage. All are omnivorous to some degree.

 Ivory-backed woodswallow, Artamus monachus (E)
 Great woodswallow, Artamus maximus 
 White-breasted woodswallow, Artamus leucorynchus 
 Black-faced woodswallow, Artamus cinereus 
 Mountain peltops, Peltops montanus 
 Lowland peltops, Peltops blainvillii 
 Black-backed butcherbird, Cracticus mentalis 
 Hooded butcherbird, Cracticus cassicus 
 Black butcherbird, Cracticus quoyi 
 Australian magpie, Gymnorhina tibicen

Mottled berryhunter
Order: PasseriformesFamily: Rhagologidae

The mottled berryhunter or mottled whistler (Rhagologus leucostigma) is a species of bird whose relationships are unclear but most likely related to the woodswallows, boatbills and butcherbirds.

 Mottled berryhunter, Rhagologus leucostigma

Vangas, helmetshrikes, and allies
Order: PasseriformesFamily: Vangidae

The family Vangidae is highly variable, though most members of it resemble true shrikes to some degree.

 Large woodshrike, Tephrodornis gularis 
 Bar-winged flycatcher-shrike, Hemipus picatus
 Black-winged flycatcher-shrike, Hemipus hirundinaceus 
 Rufous-winged philentoma, Philentoma pyrhoptera 
 Maroon-breasted philentoma, Philentoma velata

Bristlehead
Order: PasseriformesFamily: Pityriasidae

The Bornean bristlehead (Pityriasis gymnocephala), also variously known as the bristled shrike, bald-headed crow or the bald-headed wood-shrike, is the only member of the passerine family Pityriasidae and genus Pityriasis.  It is an enigmatic and uncommon species of the rainforest canopy of the island of Borneo, to which it is endemic.

 Bornean bristlehead, Pityriasis gymnocephala

Ioras
Order: PasseriformesFamily: Aegithinidae

The ioras are bulbul-like birds of open forest or thorn scrub, but whereas that group tends to be drab in colouration, ioras are sexually dimorphic, with the males being brightly plumaged in yellows and greens.

 Common iora, Aegithina tiphia 
 Green iora, Aegithina viridissima

Fantails
Order: PasseriformesFamily: Rhipiduridae

The fantails are small insectivorous birds with longish, frequently fanned, tails.

 Drongo fantail, Chaetorhynchus papuensis 
 Cerulean flycatcher, Eutrichomyias rowleyi (E)
 Black fantail, Rhipidura atra
 Spotted fantail, Rhipidura perlata 
 Cinnamon-tailed fantail, Rhipidura fuscorufa (E)
 Northern fantail, Rhipidura rufiventris
 Brown-capped fantail, Rhipidura diluta (E)
 Sooty thicket-fantail, Rhipidura threnothorax
 Black thicket-fantail, Rhipidura maculipectus
 White-bellied thicket-fantail, Rhipidura leucothorax
 Willie-wagtail, Rhipidura leucophrys 
 Malaysian pied fantail, Rhipidura javanica 
 White-throated fantail, Rhipidura albicollis 
 Rufous-tailed fantail, Rhipidura phoenicura (E) 
 White-bellied fantail, Rhipidura euryura (E)
 Rufous-backed fantail, Rhipidura rufidorsa 
 Dimorphic fantail, Rhipidura brachyrhyncha
 Sulawesi fantail, Rhipidura teysmanni 
 Peleng fantail, Rhipidura habibiei (E)
 Taliabu fantail, Rhipidura sulaensis
 Tawny-backed fantail, Rhipidura superflua (E)
 Streak-breasted fantail, Rhipidura dedemi (E)
 Long-tailed fantail, Rhipidura opistherythra (E)
 Rufous fantail, Rhipidura rufifrons
 Arafura fantail, Rhipidura dryas
 Friendly fantail, Rhipidura albolimbata 
 Chestnut-bellied fantail, Rhipidura hyperythra
 Mangrove fantail, Rhipidura phasiana

Drongos
Order: PasseriformesFamily: Dicruridae

The drongos are mostly black or dark grey in colour, sometimes with metallic tints. They have long forked tails, and some Asian species have elaborate tail decorations. They have short legs and sit very upright when perched, like a shrike. They flycatch or take prey from the ground.

 Black drongo, Dicrurus macrocercus 
 Ashy drongo, Dicrurus leucophaeus 
 Crow-billed drongo, Dicrurus annectens 
 Bronzed drongo, Dicrurus aeneus 
 Lesser racket-tailed drongo, Dicrurus remifer
 Hair-crested drongo, Dicrurus hottentottus 
 Sulawesi drongo, Dicrurus montanus (E)
 Sumatran drongo, Dicrurus sumatranus (E)
 Wallacean drongo, Dicrurus densus (E)
 Spangled drongo, Dicrurus bracteatus 
 Greater racket-tailed drongo, Dicrurus paradiseus

Birds-of-paradise
Order: PasseriformesFamily: Paradisaeidae

The birds-of-paradise are best known for the striking plumage possessed by the males of most species, in particular highly elongated and elaborate feathers extending from the tail, wings or head. These plumes are used in courtship displays to attract females.

 Paradise-crow, Lycocorax pyrrhopterus (E)
 Trumpet manucode, Phonygammus keraudrenii 
 Crinkle-collared manucode, Manucodia chalybatus 
 Jobi manucode, Manucodia jobiensis 
 Glossy-mantled manucode, Manucodia ater
 King-of-Saxony bird-of-paradise, Pteridophora alberti 
 Carola's parotia, Parotia carolae
 Bronze parotia, Parotia berlepschi (A)
 Western parotia, Parotia sefilata (E)
 Twelve-wired bird-of-paradise, Seleucidis melanoleucus 
 Black-billed sicklebill, Drepanornis albertisi 
 Pale-billed sicklebill, Drepanornis bruijnii 
 Standardwing bird-of-paradise, Semioptera wallacii (E)
 Vogelkop lophorina, Lophorina niedda (E)
 Greater lophorina, Lophorina superba 
 Magnificent riflebird, Ptiloris magnificus 
 Growling riflebird, Ptiloris intercedens 
 Black sicklebill, Epimachus fastuosus 
 Brown sicklebill, Epimachus meyeri 
 Long-tailed paradigalla, Paradigalla carunculata (E)
 Short-tailed paradigalla, Paradigalla brevicauda 
 Splendid astrapia, Astrapia splendidissima
 Arfak astrapia, Astrapia nigra (E)
 Ribbon-tailed astrapia, Astrapia mayeri 
 King bird-of-paradise, Cicinnurus regius
 Wilson's bird-of-paradise, Cicinnurus respublica (E)
 Magnificent bird-of-paradise, Cicinnurus magnificus 
 Red bird-of-paradise, Paradisaea rubra (E)
 Lesser bird-of-paradise, Paradisaea minor 
 Raggiana bird-of-paradise, Paradisaea raggiana (A)
 Greater bird-of-paradise, Paradisaea apoda

Ifrita
Order: PasseriformesFamily: Ifritidae

The ifritas are a small and insectivorous passerine  currently placed in the monotypic family, Ifritidae. Previously, the ifrit has been placed in a plethora of families including Cinclosomatidae or Monarchidae. They are considered an ancient relic species endemic to New Guinea.

 Blue-capped ifrita, Ifrita kowaldi

Monarch flycatchers
Order: PasseriformesFamily: Monarchidae

The monarch flycatchers are small to medium-sized insectivorous passerines which hunt by gleaning, hovering or flycatching.

 Black-naped monarch, Hypothymis azurea
 Pale-blue monarch, Hypothymis puella
 Rufous paradise-flycatcher, Terpsiphone cinnamomea
 Japanese paradise-flycatcher, Terpsiphone atrocaudata (A)
 Amur paradise-flycatcher, Terpsiphone incei 
 Blyth's paradise-flycatcher, Terpsiphone affinis
 Indian paradise-flycatcher, Terpsiphone paradisi (A) 
 White-naped monarch, Carterornis pileatus (E)
 Loetoe monarch, Carterornis castus (E)
 Golden monarch, Carterornis chrysomela
 Island monarch, Monarcha cinerascens 
 Black-faced monarch, Monarcha melanopsis 
 Black-winged monarch, Monarcha frater 
 Fan-tailed monarch, Symposiachrus axillaris
 Rufous monarch, Symposiachrus rubiensis 
 Flores monarch, Symposiachrus sacerdotum (E)
 Black-chinned monarch, Symposiachrus boanensis (E)
 Spectacled monarch, Symposiachrus trivirgatus 
 White-tailed monarch, Symposiachrus leucurus (E)
 White-tipped monarch, Symposiachrus everetti (E)
 Black-tipped monarch, Symposiachrus loricatus (E)
 Kofiau monarch, Symposiachrus julianae (E)
 Biak monarch, Symposiachrus brehmii (E)
 Hooded monarch, Symposiachrus manadensis 
 Black-bibbed monarch, Symposiachrus mundus (E)
 Spot-winged monarch, Symposiachrus guttula 
 Frilled monarch, Arses telescophthalmus
 Ochre-collared monarch, Arses insularis 
 Magpie-lark, Grallina cyanoleuca 
 Torrent-lark, Grallina bruijni 
 Biak flycatcher, Myiagra atra (E)
 Moluccan flycatcher, Myiagra galeata (E)
 Leaden flycatcher, Myiagra rubecula 
 Broad-billed flycatcher, Myiagra ruficollis 
 Satin flycatcher, Myiagra cyanoleuca
 Restless flycatcher, Myiagra inquieta (A)
 Paperbark flycatcher, Myiagra nana
 Shining flycatcher, Myiagra alecto

Melampittas
Order: PasseriformesFamily: Melampittidae

They are little studied and before being established as a family in 2014 their taxonomic relationships with other birds were uncertain, being considered at one time related variously to the pittas, Old World babblers and birds-of-paradise.

 Lesser melampitta, Melampitta lugubris
 Greater melampitta, Melampitta gigantea

Crested shrikejay
Order: PasseriformesFamily: Platylophidae

Until 2018 this species was included in family Corvidae, but genetic and morphological evidence place it in its own family.

 Crested shrikejay, Platylophus galericulatus

Shrikes
Order: PasseriformesFamily: Laniidae

Shrikes are passerine birds known for the habit of some species of catching other birds and small animals and impaling the uneaten portions of their bodies on thorns. A shrike's beak is hooked, like that of a typical bird of prey.

 Tiger shrike, Lanius tigrinus 
 Brown shrike, Lanius cristatus 
 Long-tailed shrike, Lanius schach

Crows, jays, and magpies
Order: PasseriformesFamily: Corvidae

The family Corvidae includes crows, ravens, jays, choughs, magpies, treepies, nutcrackers, and ground jays. Corvids are above average in size among the Passeriformes, and some of the larger species show high levels of intelligence.

 Black magpie, Platysmurus leucopterus 
 Common green-magpie, Cissa chinensis 
 Javan green-magpie, Cissa thalassina 
 Bornean green-magpie, Cissa jefferyi 
 Sumatran treepie, Dendrocitta occipitalis (E)
 Bornean treepie, Dendrocitta cinerascens
 Racket-tailed treepie, Crypsirina temia 
 House crow, Corvus splendens 
 Banggai crow, Corvus unicolor (E)
 Slender-billed crow, Corvus enca
 Violet crow, Corvus violaceus 
 Piping crow, Corvus typicus (E)
 Flores crow, Corvus florensis (E)
 Long-billed crow, Corvus validus (E)
 Brown-headed crow, Corvus fuscicapillus (E)
 Gray crow, Corvus tristis
 Large-billed crow, Corvus macrorhynchos
 Torresian crow, Corvus orru

Satinbirds
Order: PasseriformesFamily: Cnemophilidae

They are a family of passerine birds which consists of four species found in the mountain forests of New Guinea. They were originally thought to be part of the birds-of-paradise family Paradisaeidae until genetic research suggested that the birds are not closely related to birds-of-paradise at all and are perhaps closer to berry peckers and longbills (Melanocharitidae). The current evidence suggests that their closest relatives may be the cuckoo-shrikes (Campephagidae).

 Loria's satinbird, Cnemophilus loriae 
 Crested satinbird, Cnemophilus macgregorii
 Yellow-breasted satinbird, Loboparadisea sericea

Berrypeckers and longbills
Order: PasseriformesFamily: Melanocharitidae

The Melanocharitidae are medium-sized birds which feed on fruit and some insects and other invertebrates. They have drab plumage in greys, browns or black and white. The berrypeckers resemble stout short-billed honeyeaters, and the longbills are like drab sunbirds.

 Obscure berrypecker, Melanocharis arfakiana 
 Black berrypecker, Melanocharis nigra 
 Mid-mountain berrypecker, Melanocharis longicauda 
 Fan-tailed berrypecker, Melanocharis versteri 
 Satin berrypecker, Melanocharis citreola (E)
 Streaked berrypecker, Melanocharis striativentris 
 Spotted berrypecker, Melanocharis crassirostris 
 Yellow-bellied longbill, Toxorhamphus novaeguineae 
 Slaty-chinned longbill, Toxorhamphus poliopterus 
 Spectacled longbill, Oedistoma iliolophus 
 Pygmy longbill, Oedistoma pygmaeum

Australasian robins
Order: PasseriformesFamily: Petroicidae

Most species of Petroicidae have a stocky build with a large rounded head, a short straight bill and rounded wingtips. They occupy a wide range of wooded habitats, from subalpine to tropical rainforest, and mangrove swamp to semi-arid scrubland. All are primarily insectivores, although a few supplement their diet with seeds.

 Greater ground-robin, Amalocichla sclateriana
 Lesser ground-robin, Amalocichla incerta
 Torrent flycatcher, Monachella muelleriana 
 Golden-bellied flyrobin, Microeca hemixantha (E)
 Lemon-bellied flycatcher, Microeca flavigaster 
 Yellow-legged flycatcher, Microeca griseoceps 
 Olive flyrobin, Microeca flavovirescens 
 Papuan flycatcher, Microeca papuana 
 Garnet robin, Eugerygone rubra
 Subalpine robin, Petroica bivittata 
 Snow Mountain robin, Petroica archboldi (E)
 White-faced robin, Tregellasia leucops 
 Mangrove robin, Eopsaltria pulverulenta
 Black-chinned robin, Poecilodryas brachyura 
 Black-sided robin, Poecilodryas hypoleuca 
 Olive-yellow robin, Poecilodryas placens 
 Black-throated robin, Poecilodryas albonotata 
 White-winged robin, Peneothello sigillata 
 Smoky robin, Peneothello cryptoleuca (E)
 White-rumped robin, Peneothello bimaculata
 Blue-gray robin, Peneothello cyanus 
 Ashy robin, Heteromyias albispecularis 
 Green-backed robin, Pachycephalopsis hattamensis 
 White-eyed robin, Pachycephalopsis poliosoma 
 Papuan scrub-robin, Drymodes beccarii

Rail-babbler
Order: PasseriformesFamily: Eupetidae

The Malaysian rail-babbler is a rail-like passerine bird which inhabits the floor of primary forest in the Malay Peninsula and Sumatra. It is the only member of its family.

 Malaysian rail-babbler, Eupetes macrocerus

Fairy flycatchers
Order: PasseriformesFamily: Stenostiridae

Most of the species of this small family are found in Africa, though a few inhabit tropical Asia. They are not closely related to other birds called "flycatchers".

 Gray-headed canary-flycatcher, Culicicapa ceylonensis 
 Citrine canary-flycatcher, Culicicapa helianthea

Tits, chickadees, and titmice
Order: PasseriformesFamily: Paridae

The Paridae are mainly small stocky woodland species with short stout bills. Some have crests. They are adaptable birds, with a mixed diet including seeds and insects.

 Sultan tit, Melanochlora sultanea
 Cinereous tit, Parus cinereus

Larks
Order: PasseriformesFamily: Alaudidae

Larks are small terrestrial birds with often extravagant songs and display flights. Most larks are fairly dull in appearance. Their food is insects and seeds.

 Horsfield’s bushlark, Mirafra javanica

Cisticolas and allies
Order: PasseriformesFamily: Cisticolidae

The Cisticolidae are warblers found mainly in warmer southern regions of the Old World. They are generally very small birds of drab brown or grey appearance found in open country such as grassland or scrub.

 Common tailorbird, Orthotomus sutorius 
 Dark-necked tailorbird, Orthotomus atrogularis
 Ashy tailorbird, Orthotomus ruficeps
 Olive-backed tailorbird, Orthotomus sepium (E)
 Rufous-tailed tailorbird, Orthotomus sericeus
 Brown prinia, Prinia polychroa 
 Hill prinia, Prinia superciliaris 
 Bar-winged prinia, Prinia familiaris (E)
 Yellow-bellied prinia, Prinia flaviventris 
 Plain prinia, Prinia inornata 
 Zitting cisticola, Cisticola juncidis 
 Golden-headed cisticola, Cisticola exilis

Reed warblers and allies
Order: PasseriformesFamily: Acrocephalidae

The members of this family are usually rather large for "warblers". Most are rather plain olivaceous brown above with much yellow to beige below. They are usually found in open woodland, reedbeds, or tall grass. The family occurs mostly in southern to western Eurasia and surroundings, but it also ranges far into the Pacific, with some species in Africa.

 Black-browed reed warbler, Acrocephalus bistrigiceps (A)
 Oriental reed warbler, Acrocephalus orientalis
 Clamorous reed warbler, Acrocephalus stentoreus 
 Australian reed warbler, Acrocephalus australis

Grassbirds and allies
Order: PasseriformesFamily: Locustellidae

Locustellidae are a family of small insectivorous songbirds found mainly in Eurasia, Africa, and the Australian region. They are smallish birds with tails that are usually long and pointed, and tend to be drab brownish or buffy all over.

 Gray's grasshopper warbler, Helopsaltes fasciolatus
 Sakhalin grasshopper warbler, Helopsaltes amnicola
 Pallas's grasshopper warbler, Helopsaltes certhiola 
 Middendorff's grasshopper warbler, Helopsaltes ochotensis (A)
 Lanceolated warbler, Locustella lanceolata 
 Sulawesi bush warbler, Locustella castanea (E)
 Seram bush warbler, Locustella musculus (E)
 Taliabu bush warbler, Locustella portenta (E)
 Buru bush warbler, Locustella disturbans (E)
 Javan bush warbler, Locustella montis (E)
 Fly River grassbird, Poodytes albolimbatus 
 Little grassbird, Poodytes gramineus
 Malia, Malia grata (E)
 Buff-banded bushbird, Cincloramphus bivittatus (E)
 Tawny grassbird, Cincloramphus timoriensis 
 Papuan grassbird, Cincloramphus macrurus 
 Striated grassbird, Megalurus palustris

Cupwings
Order: PasseriformesFamily: Pnoepygidae

The members of this small family are found in mountainous parts of South and South East Asia.

 Pygmy cupwing, Pnoepyga pusilla

Swallows
Order: PasseriformesFamily: Hirundinidae

The family Hirundinidae is adapted to aerial feeding. They have a slender streamlined body, long pointed wings, and a short bill with a wide gape. The feet are adapted to perching rather than walking, and the front toes are partially joined at the base.

 Bank swallow, Riparia riparia (A)
 Barn swallow, Hirundo rustica 
 Pacific swallow, Hirundo tahitica 
 Red-rumped swallow, Cecropis daurica 
 Striated swallow, Cecropis striolata 
 Fairy martin, Petrochelidon ariel 
 Tree martin, Petrochelidon nigricans
 Asian house-martin, Delichon dasypus

Bulbuls
Order: PasseriformesFamily: Pycnonotidae

Bulbuls are medium-sized songbirds. Some are colourful with yellow, red, or orange vents, cheeks, throats, or supercilia, but most are drab, with uniform olive-brown to black plumage. Some species have distinct crests.

 Black-and-white bulbul, Brachypodius melanoleucos 
 Puff-backed bulbul, Brachypodius eutilotus 
 Black-headed bulbul, Brachypodius melanocephalos 
 Spectacled bulbul, Rubigula erythropthalmos 
 Gray-bellied bulbul, Rubigula cyaniventris 
 Scaly-breasted bulbul, Rubigula squamata
 Ruby-throated bulbul, Rubigula dispar 
 Bornean bulbul, Rubigula montis
 Straw-headed bulbul, Pycnonotus zeylanicus 
 Cream-striped bulbul, Pycnonotus leucogrammicus (E)
 Spot-necked bulbul, Pycnonotus tympanistrigus (E)
 Red-whiskered bulbul, Pycnonotus jocosus (I)
 Sooty-headed bulbul, Pycnonotus aurigaster 
 Blue-wattled bulbul, Pycnonotus nieuwenhuisii (E)
 Aceh bulbul, Pycnonotus snouckaerti (E)
 Orange-spotted bulbul, Pycnonotus bimaculatus 
 Flavescent bulbul, Pycnonotus flavescens 
 Yellow-vented bulbul, Pycnonotus goiavier 
 Olive-winged bulbul, Pycnonotus plumosus
 Cream-eyed bulbul, Pycnonotus pseudosimplex
 Cream-vented bulbul, Pycnonotus simplex 
 Red-eyed bulbul, Pycnonotus brunneus 
 Hairy-backed bulbul, Tricholestes criniger 
 Hook-billed bulbul, Setornis criniger
 Finsch's bulbul, Alophoixus finschii
 Yellow-bellied bulbul, Alophoixus phaeocephalus 
 Gray-cheeked bulbul, Alophoixus tephrogenys 
 Penan bulbul, Alophoixus ruficrissus 
 Brown-cheeked bulbul, Alophoixus bres 
 Ochraceous bulbul, Alophoixus ochraceus
 Sangihe golden-bulbul, Alophoixus platenae (E)
 Togian golden-bulbul, Alophoixus aureus (E)
 Sula golden-bulbul, Alophoixus longirostris
 Halmahera golden-bulbul, Alophoixus chloris (E)
 Obi golden-bulbul, Alophoixus lucasi (E)
 Buru golden-bulbul, Alophoixus mystacalis (E)
 Seram golden-bulbul, Alophoixus affinis (E)
 Buff-vented bulbul, Iole crypta 
 Charlotte's bulbul, Iole charlottae 
 Cinereous bulbul, Hemixos cinereus 
 Sunda bulbul, Ixos virescens (E)
 Streaked bulbul, Ixos malaccensis

Leaf warblers
Order: PasseriformesFamily: Phylloscopidae

Leaf warblers are a family of small insectivorous birds found mostly in Eurasia and ranging into Wallacea and Africa. The species are of various sizes, often green-plumaged above and yellow below, or more subdued with greyish-green to greyish-brown colours.

 Yellow-browed warbler, Phylloscopus inornatus 
 Eastern crowned warbler, Phylloscopus coronatus
 Japanese leaf warbler, Phylloscopus xanthodryas
 Arctic warbler, Phylloscopus borealis
 Kamchatka leaf warbler, Phylloscopus examinandus
 Chestnut-crowned warbler, Phylloscopus castaniceps 
 Yellow-breasted warbler, Phylloscopus montis 
 Sunda warbler, Phylloscopus grammiceps (E)
 Mountain leaf warbler, Phylloscopus trivirgatus
 Timor leaf warbler, Phylloscopus presbytes (E)
 Rote leaf warbler, Phylloscopus rotiensis (E)
 Sulawesi leaf warbler, Phylloscopus nesophilus (E)
 Lompobattang leaf warbler, Phylloscopus sarasinorum (E)
 Island leaf warbler, Phylloscopus poliocephalus
 Numfor leaf warbler, Phylloscopus maforensis (E)
 Biak leaf warbler, Phylloscopus misoriensis (E)

Bush warblers and allies
Order: PasseriformesFamily: Scotocercidae

The members of this family are found throughout Africa, Asia, and Polynesia. Their taxonomy is in flux, and some authorities place some genera in other families.

 Timor stubtail, Urosphena subulata (E)
 Bornean stubtail, Urosphena whiteheadi 
 Javan tesia, Tesia superciliaris (E)
 Russet-capped tesia, Tesia everetti (E)
 Yellow-bellied warbler, Abroscopus superciliaris
 Mountain tailorbird, Phyllergates cuculatus 
 Tanimbar bush warbler, Horornis carolinae (E)
 Aberrant bush warbler, Horornis flavolivaceus

Long-tailed tits
Order: PasseriformesFamily: Aegithalidae

Long-tailed tits are a group of small passerine birds with medium to long tails. They make woven bag nests in trees. Most eat a mixed diet which includes insects.

 Pygmy tit, Aegithalos exilis (E)

White-eyes, yuhinas, and allies
Order: PasseriformesFamily: Zosteropidae

The white-eyes are small birds of rather drab appearance, the plumage above being typically greenish-olive, but some species have a white or bright yellow throat, breast, or lower parts, and several have buff flanks. As the name suggests, many species have a white ring around each eyes.

 Chestnut-crested yuhina, Staphida everetti 
 Javan gray-throated white-eye, Heleia javanicus (E)
 Gray-hooded white-eye, Heleia pinaiae (E)
 Pygmy white-eye, Heleia squamifrons 
 Streak-headed white-eye, Heleia squamiceps (E)
 White-browed white-eye, Heleia superciliaris (E)
 Dark-crowned white-eye, Heleia dohertyi (E)
 Timor white-eye, Heleia muelleri (E)
 Flores white-eye, Heleia crassirostris (E)
 Yellow-spectacled white-eye, Heleia wallacei (E)
 Rufescent white-eye, Tephrozosterops stalkeri (E)
 Black-capped white-eye, Zosterops atricapilla
 Swinhoe's white-eye, Zosterops simplex
 Mountain black-eye, Zosterops emiliae
 Warbling white-eye, Zosterops japonicus 
 Lemon-bellied white-eye, Zosterops chloris (E)
 Meratus white-eye, Zosterops meratusensis (E)
 Wakatobi white-eye, Zosterops flavissimus (E)
 Black-crowned white-eye, Zosterops atrifrons (E)
 Sangihe white-eye, Zosterops nehrkorni (E)
 Togian white-eye, Zosterops somadikartai (E)
 Sulawesi white-eye, Zosterops consobrinorum (E)
 Black-ringed white-eye, Zosterops anomalus (E)
 Black-fronted white-eye, Zosterops minor
 Cream-throated white-eye, Zosterops atriceps (E) 
 Buru white-eye, Zosterops buruensis (E)
 Seram white-eye, Zosterops stalkeri (E)
 Javan white-eye, Zosterops flavus (E)
 Ashy-bellied white-eye, Zosterops citrinella
 Hume's white-eye, Zosterops auriventer 
 Sangkar white-eye, Zosterops melanurus
 Everett's white-eye, Zosterops everetti
 Capped white-eye, Zosterops fuscicapilla 
 Biak white-eye, Zosterops mysorensis (E)
 New Guinea white-eye, Zosterops novaeguineae 
 Ambon white-eye, Zosterops kuehni (E)
 Great Kai white-eye, Zosterops grayi (E)
 Little Kai white-eye, Zosterops uropygialis (E)

Tree-babblers, scimitar-babblers, and allies
Order: PasseriformesFamily: Timaliidae

The members of this family are somewhat diverse in size and colouration, but are characterised by soft fluffy plumage.

 Chestnut-capped babbler, Timalia pileata
 Gray-cheeked tit-babbler, Mixornis flavicollis (E)
 Kangean tit-babbler, Mixornis prillwitzi (E)
 Pin-striped tit-babbler, Mixornis gularis 
 Bold-striped tit-babbler, Mixornis bornensis 
 Fluffy-backed tit-babbler, Macronus ptilosus 
 Golden babbler, Cyanoderma chrysaeum 
 Chestnut-winged babbler, Cyanoderma erythropterum 
 Gray-hooded babbler, Cyanoderma bicolor
 Crescent-chested babbler, Cyanoderma melanothorax (E)
 Rufous-fronted babbler, Cyanoderma rufifrons 
 Black laughingthrush, Melanocichla lugubris 
 Bare-headed laughingthrush, Melanocichla calva 
 Javan scimitar-babbler, Pomatorhinus montanus  (E)
 Sunda scimitar-babbler, Pomatorhinus bornensis
 Black-throated babbler, Stachyris nigricollis 
 White-breasted babbler, Stachyris grammiceps (E)
 Chestnut-rumped babbler, Stachyris maculata 
 Gray-throated babbler, Stachyris nigriceps 
 Gray-headed babbler, Stachyris poliocephala 
 White-necked babbler, Stachyris leucotis 
 White-bibbed babbler, Stachyris thoracica (E)
 Spot-necked babbler, Stachyris striolata

Ground babblers and allies
Order: PasseriformesFamily: Pellorneidae

These small to medium-sized songbirds have soft fluffy plumage but are otherwise rather diverse. Members of the genus Illadopsis are found in forests, but some other genera are birds of scrublands.

 Large wren-babbler, Turdinus macrodactylus 
 Marbled wren-babbler, Turdinus marmoratus
 Black-throated wren-babbler, Turdinus atrigularis  
 Sooty-capped babbler, Malacopteron affine
 Gray-breasted babbler, Malacopteron albogulare 
 Scaly-crowned babbler, Malacopteron cinereum 
 Rufous-crowned babbler, Malacopteron magnum 
 Moustached babbler, Malacopteron magnirostre 
 Black-capped babbler, Pellorneum capistratum
 Short-tailed babbler, Pellorneum malaccense 
 Buff-breasted babbler, Pellorneum tickelli
 Sumatran babbler, Pellorneum buettikoferi (E)
 Temminck's babbler, Pellorneum pyrrogenys 
 White-chested babbler, Pellorneum rostratum 
 Ferruginous babbler, Pellorneum bicolor
 Sulawesi babbler, Pellorneum celebense (E)
 Abbott's babbler, Malacocincla abbotti
 Horsfield's babbler, Malacocincla sepiaria
 Black-browed babbler, Malacocincla perspicillata (E)
 Mountain wren-babbler, Gypsophila crassa
 Rusty-breasted wren-babbler, Gypsophila rufipectus (E)
 Striped wren-babbler, Kenopia striata
 Bornean wren-babbler, Ptilocichla leucogrammica 
 Eyebrowed wren-babbler, Napothera epilepidota
 Sumatran wren-babbler, Napothera albostriata

Laughingthrushes and allies
Order: PasseriformesFamily: Leiothrichidae

The members of this family are diverse in size and colouration, though those of genus Turdoides tend to be brown or greyish. The family is found in Africa, India, and southeast Asia.

 Brown fulvetta, Alcippe brunneicauda 
 Javan fulvetta, Alcippe pyrrhoptera (E)
 Spotted crocias, Laniellus albonotatus (E)
 Long-tailed sibia, Heterophasia picaoides 
 Silver-eared mesia, Leiothrix argentauris
 Rufous-fronted laughingthrush, Garrulax rufifrons (E)
 Sunda laughingthrush, Garrulax palliatus (E)
 Sumatran laughingthrush, Garrulax bicolor (E)
 Chestnut-capped laughingthrush, Pterorhinus mitratus
 Chestnut-hooded laughingthrush, Pterorhinus treacheri

Nuthatches
Order: PasseriformesFamily: Sittidae

Nuthatches are small woodland birds. They have the unusual ability to climb down trees head first, unlike other birds which can only go upwards. Nuthatches have big heads, short tails, and powerful bills and feet.

 Velvet-fronted nuthatch, Sitta frontalis
 Blue nuthatch, Sitta azurea

Starlings
Order: PasseriformesFamily: Sturnidae

Starlings are small to medium-sized passerine birds. Their flight is strong and direct and they are very gregarious. Their preferred habitat is fairly open country. They eat insects and fruit. Plumage is typically dark with a metallic sheen.

 Fiery-browed myna, Enodes erythrophris (E)
 Finch-billed myna, Scissirostrum dubium (E)
 Metallic starling, Aplonis metallica
 Yellow-eyed starling, Aplonis mystacea 
 Tanimbar starling, Aplonis crassa (E)
 Long-tailed starling, Aplonis magna (E)
 Singing starling, Aplonis cantoroides 
 Asian glossy starling, Aplonis panayensis 
 Moluccan starling, Aplonis mysolensis (E)
 Short-tailed starling, Aplonis minor
 Sulawesi myna, Basilornis celebensis (E)
 Helmeted myna, Basilornis galeatus (E)
 Long-crested myna, Basilornis corythaix (E)
 White-necked myna, Streptocitta albicollis (E)
 Bare-eyed myna, Streptocitta albertinae (E)
 Yellow-faced myna, Mino dumontii
 Golden myna, Mino anais
 Common hill myna, Gracula religiosa 
 Enggano myna, Gracula enganensis (E)
 Nias myna, Gracula robusta (E)
 Rosy starling, Pastor roseus (A)
 Daurian starling, Agropsar sturninus
 Chestnut-cheeked starling, Agropsar philippensis
 Javan pied starling, Gracupica jalla 
 Bali myna, Leucopsar rothschildi (E)
 Common myna, Acridotheres tristis 
 Black-winged starling, Acridotheres melanopterus (E)
 Jungle myna, Acridotheres fuscus (I)
 Javan myna, Acridotheres javanicus (E)
 Pale-bellied myna, Acridotheres cinereus (E)

Thrushes and allies
Order: PasseriformesFamily: Turdidae

The thrushes are a group of passerine birds that occur mainly in the Old World. They are plump, soft plumaged, small to medium-sized insectivores or sometimes omnivores, often feeding on the ground. Many have attractive songs.

 Geomalia, Zoothera heinrichi (E)
 Everett's thrush, Zoothera everetti 
 Sunda thrush, Zoothera andromedae 
 Scaly thrush, Zoothera dauma 
 Russet-tailed thrush, Zoothera heinei 
 Fawn-breasted thrush, Zoothera machiki (E)
 Sulawesi thrush, Cataponera turdoides (E)
 Fruit-hunter, Chlamydochaera jefferyi 
 Sumatran cochoa, Cochoa beccarii (E)
 Javan cochoa, Cochoa azurea (E)
 Siberian thrush, Geokichla sibirica
 Buru thrush, Geokichla dumasi
 Seram thrush, Geokichla joiceyi (E) 
 Chestnut-capped thrush, Geokichla interpres
 Enggano thrush, Geokichla leucolaema 
 Chestnut-backed thrush, Geokichla dohertyi (E)
 Orange-banded thrush, Geokichla peronii (E)
 Slaty-backed thrush, Geokichla schistacea (E)
 Rusty-backed thrush, Geokichla erythronota (E)
 Red-and-black thrush, Geokichla mendeni (E)
 Orange-headed thrush, Geokichla citrina
 Eyebrowed thrush, Turdus obscurus
 Island thrush, Turdus poliocephalus

Old World flycatchers
Order: PasseriformesFamily: Muscicapidae

Old World flycatchers are a large group of small arboreal insectivores. The appearance of these birds is highly varied, but they mostly have weak songs and harsh calls.

 Gray-streaked flycatcher, Muscicapa griseisticta 
 Dark-sided flycatcher, Muscicapa sibirica
 Ferruginous flycatcher, Muscicapa ferruginea 
 Asian brown flycatcher, Muscicapa dauurica 
 Sumba brown flycatcher, Muscicapa segregata (E)
 Sulawesi brown flycatcher, Muscicapa sodhii (E)
 Brown-streaked flycatcher, Muscicapa williamsoni 
 Oriental magpie-robin, Copsychus saularis 
 Rufous-tailed shama, Copsychus pyrropygus
 White-rumped shama, Copsychus malabaricus 
 White-crowned shama, Copsychus stricklandii
 Rufous-browed flycatcher, Anthipes solitaris
 Matinan blue flycatcher, Cyornis sanfordi (E)
 Blue-fronted flycatcher, Cyornis hoevelli (E)
 Timor blue flycatcher, Cyornis hyacinthinus (E)
 White-tailed flycatcher, Cyornis concretus
 Rück's blue flycatcher, Cyornis ruckii (E)
 Pale blue flycatcher, Cyornis unicolor
 Javan blue flycatcher, Cyornis banyumas 
 Dayak blue flycatcher, Cyornis montanus
 Meratus blue flycatcher, Cyornis kadayangensis (E)
 Sunda blue flycatcher, Cyornis caerulatus 
 Malaysian blue flycatcher, Cyornis turcosus 
 Bornean blue flycatcher, Cyornis superbus 
 Indochinese blue flycatcher, Cyornis sumatrensis
 Mangrove blue flycatcher, Cyornis rufigastra 
 Sulawesi blue flycatcher, Cyornis omissus (E)
 Gray-chested jungle-flycatcher, Cyornis umbratilis 
 Fulvous-chested jungle-flycatcher, Cyornis olivaceus 
 Chestnut-tailed jungle-flycatcher, Cyornis ruficauda
 Banggai jungle flycatcher, Cyornis pelingensis (E)
 Sula jungle flycatcher, Cyornis colonus 
 Large niltava, Niltava grandis 
 Rufous-vented niltava, Niltava sumatrana
 Blue-and-white flycatcher, Cyanoptila cyanomelana 
 Zappey's flycatcher, Cyanoptila cumatilis
 Flores jungle flycatcher, Eumyias oscillans (E)
 Sumba jungle flycatcher, Eumyias stresemanni (E)
 Indigo flycatcher, Eumyias indigo
 Verditer flycatcher, Eumyias thalassinus 
 Buru jungle-flycatcher, Eumyias additus (E)
 Turquoise flycatcher, Eumyias panayensis 
 Eyebrowed jungle-flycatcher, Vauriella gularis 
 Great shortwing, Heinrichia calligyna (E)
 Lesser shortwing, Brachypteryx leucophrys 
 Bornean shortwing, Brachypteryx erythrogyna
 Sumatran shortwing, Brachypteryx saturata (E)
 Javan shortwing, Brachypteryx montana (E)
 Flores shortwing, Brachypteryx floris (E)
 Siberian blue robin, Larvivora cyane
 Shiny whistling-thrush, Myophonus melanurus (E)
 Javan whistling-thrush, Myophonus glaucinus 
 Sumatran whistling-thrush, Myophonus castaneus 
 Bornean whistling-thrush, Myophonus borneensis 
 Blue whistling-thrush, Myophonus caeruleus
 White-crowned forktail, Enicurus leschenaulti
 Bornean forktail, Enicurus borneensis
 Sunda forktail, Enicurus velatus (E)
 Chestnut-naped forktail, Enicurus ruficapillus
 Sunda robin, Myiomela diana (E)
 Red-flanked bluetail, Tarsiger cyanurus (A)
 Yellow-rumped flycatcher, Ficedula zanthopygia 
 Narcissus flycatcher, Ficedula narcissina 
 Mugimaki flycatcher, Ficedula mugimaki 
 Snowy-browed flycatcher, Ficedula hyperythra 
 Pygmy flycatcher, Ficedula hodgsoni 
 Little pied flycatcher, Ficedula westermanni 
 Taiga flycatcher, Ficedula albicilla (A)
 Tanimbar flycatcher, Ficedula riedeli (E) 
 Rufous-chested flycatcher, Ficedula dumetoria 
 Rufous-throated flycatcher, Ficedula rufigula (E)
 Damar flycatcher, Ficedula henrici (E)
 Cinnamon-chested flycatcher, Ficedula buruensis (E)
 Lompobattang flycatcher, Ficedula bonthaina (E)
 Sumba flycatcher, Ficedula harterti (E)
 Black-banded flycatcher, Ficedula timorensis (E)
 Blue rock-thrush, Monticola solitarius 
 Siberian stonechat, Saxicola maurus 
 Amur stonechat, Saxicola stejnegeri
 Pied bushchat, Saxicola caprata
 Timor bushchat, Saxicola gutturalis (E)

HylocitreaOrder: PasseriformesFamily: Hylocitreidae

The hylocitrea (Hylocitrea bonensis), also known as the yellow-flanked whistler or olive-flanked whistler, is a species of bird that is endemic to montane forests on the Indonesian island of Sulawesi.

 Hylocitrea, Hylocitrea bonensis (E)

FlowerpeckersOrder: PasseriformesFamily: Dicaeidae

The flowerpeckers are very small, stout, often brightly coloured birds, with short tails, short thick curved bills, and tubular tongues.

 Yellow-breasted flowerpecker, Prionochilus maculatus 
 Crimson-breasted flowerpecker, Prionochilus percussus
 Yellow-rumped flowerpecker, Prionochilus xanthopygius 
 Scarlet-breasted flowerpecker, Prionochilus thoracicus 
 Spectacled flowerpecker, Dicaeum dayakorum
 Golden-rumped flowerpecker, Dicaeum annae (E)
 Thick-billed flowerpecker, Dicaeum agile 
 Brown-backed flowerpecker, Dicaeum everetti 
 Yellow-vented flowerpecker, Dicaeum chrysorrheum 
 Yellow-sided flowerpecker, Dicaeum aureolimbatum (E)
 Orange-bellied flowerpecker, Dicaeum trigonostigma 
 Plain flowerpecker, Dicaeum minullum 
 Crimson-crowned flowerpecker, Dicaeum nehrkorni (E)
 Halmahera flowerpecker, Dicaeum schistaceiceps (E)
 Buru flowerpecker, Dicaeum erythrothorax (E)
 Ashy flowerpecker, Dicaeum vulneratum (E)
 Olive-crowned flowerpecker, Dicaeum pectorale 
 Red-capped flowerpecker, Dicaeum geelvinkianum 
 Black-fronted flowerpecker, Dicaeum igniferum (E)
 Red-chested flowerpecker, Dicaeum maugei (E)
 Fire-breasted flowerpecker, Dicaeum ignipectus 
 Black-sided flowerpecker, Dicaeum monticolum 
 Gray-sided flowerpecker, Dicaeum celebicum (E) 
 Blood-breasted flowerpecker, Dicaeum sanguinolentum (E)
 Mistletoebird, Dicaeum hirundinaceum 
 Scarlet-backed flowerpecker, Dicaeum cruentatum 
 Scarlet-headed flowerpecker, Dicaeum trochileum (E) 

Sunbirds and spiderhuntersOrder: PasseriformesFamily: Nectariniidae

The sunbirds and spiderhunters are very small passerine birds which feed largely on nectar, although they will also take insects, especially when feeding young. Their flight is fast and direct on short wings. Most species can take nectar by hovering like a hummingbird, but usually perch to feed.

 Ruby-cheeked sunbird, Chalcoparia singalensis
 Plain sunbird, Anthreptes simplex
 Brown-throated sunbird, Anthreptes malacensis 
 Red-throated sunbird, Anthreptes rhodolaemus 
 Van Hasselt's sunbird, Leptocoma brasiliana
 Purple-throated sunbird, Leptocoma sperata 
 Black sunbird, Leptocoma aspasia 
 Copper-throated sunbird, Leptocoma calcostetha
 Olive-backed sunbird, Cinnyris jugularis
 Apricot-breasted sunbird, Cinnyris buettikoferi (E) 
 Flame-breasted sunbird, Cinnyris solaris (E)
 Elegant sunbird, Aethopyga duyvenbodei (E)
 Temminck's sunbird, Aethopyga temminckii
 Javan sunbird, Aethopyga mystacalis 
 Crimson sunbird, Aethopyga siparaja 
 White-flanked sunbird, Aethopyga eximia (E)
 Purple-naped spiderhunter, Kurochkinegramma hypogrammicum 
 Thick-billed spiderhunter, Arachnothera crassirostris 
 Long-billed spiderhunter, Arachnothera robusta 
 Little spiderhunter, Arachnothera longirostra 
 Whitehead's spiderhunter, Arachnothera juliae 
 Yellow-eared spiderhunter, Arachnothera chrysogenys 
 Spectacled spiderhunter, Arachnothera flavigaster
 Streaky-breasted spiderhunter, Arachnothera affinis 
 Gray-breasted spiderhunter, Arachnothera modesta 
 Bornean spiderhunter, Arachnothera everetti 

Fairy-bluebirdsOrder: PasseriformesFamily: Irenidae

The fairy-bluebirds are bulbul-like birds of open forest or thorn scrub. The males are dark-blue and the females a duller green.

 Asian fairy-bluebird, Irena puella

LeafbirdsOrder: PasseriformesFamily: Chloropseidae

The leafbirds are small, bulbul-like birds. The males are brightly plumaged, usually in greens and yellows.

 Greater green leafbird, Chloropsis sonnerati 
 Lesser green leafbird, Chloropsis cyanopogon 
 Blue-winged leafbird, Chloropsis cochinchinensis
 Bornean leafbird, Chloropsis kinabaluensis (A)
 Sumatran leafbird, Chloropsis media (E)
 Blue-masked leafbird, Chloropsis venusta (E)

Weavers and alliesOrder: PasseriformesFamily: Ploceidae

The weavers are small passerine birds related to the finches. They are seed-eating birds with rounded conical bills. The males of many species are brightly coloured, usually in red or yellow and black, but some species show variation in colour only in the breeding season.

 Streaked weaver, Ploceus manyar 
 Baya weaver, Ploceus philippinus
 Asian golden weaver, Ploceus hypoxanthus

Waxbills and alliesOrder: PasseriformesFamily: Estrildidae

The estrildid finches are small passerine birds of the Old World tropics and Australasia. They are gregarious and often colonial seed eaters with short thick but pointed bills. They are all similar in structure and habits, but have wide variation in plumage colours and patterns.

 Mountain firetail, Oreostruthus fuliginosus
 Crimson finch, Neochmia phaeton 
 Zebra finch, Taeniopygia guttata
 Java sparrow, Padda oryzivora 
 Timor sparrow, Padda fuscata
 Streak-headed munia, Mayrimunia tristissima 
 White-spotted munia, Mayrimunia leucosticta 
 Scaly-breasted munia, Lonchura punctulata 
 Black-faced munia, Lonchura molucca (E)
 White-rumped munia, Lonchura striata 
 Dusky munia, Lonchura fuscans
 White-bellied munia, Lonchura leucogastra 
 Javan munia, Lonchura leucogastroides (E) 
 Chestnut munia, Lonchura atricapilla 
 White-capped munia, Lonchura ferruginosa (E)
 White-headed munia, Lonchura maja 
 Pale-headed munia, Lonchura pallida (E)
 Grand munia, Lonchura grandis 
 Black-breasted munia, Lonchura teerinki (E)
 Snow Mountain munia, Lonchura montana 
 Gray-banded munia, Lonchura vana (E)
 Gray-crowned munia, Lonchura nevermanni 
 Hooded munia, Lonchura spectabilis 
 Five-colored munia, Lonchura quinticolor (E)
 Chestnut-breasted munia, Lonchura castaneothorax
 Black munia, Lonchura stygia
 Pin-tailed parrotfinch, Erythrura prasina 
 Tawny-breasted parrotfinch, Erythrura hyperythra 
 Tricolored parrotfinch, Erythrura tricolor (E)
 Papuan parrotfinch, Erythrura papuana 
 Blue-faced parrotfinch, Erythrura trichroa 
 Red avadavat, Amandava amandava 

Old World sparrowsOrder: PasseriformesFamily: Passeridae

Sparrows are small passerine birds, typically small, plump, brown or grey with short tails and short powerful beaks. They are seed-eaters, but also consume small insects.

 House sparrow, Passer domesticus (I)
 Eurasian tree sparrow, Passer montanus

Wagtails and pipitsOrder: PasseriformesFamily: Motacillidae

Motacillidae is a family of small passerine birds with medium to long tails and comprises the wagtails, longclaws, and pipits. These are slender ground-feeding insectivores of open country.

 Forest wagtail, Dendronanthus indicus 
 Gray wagtail, Motacilla cinerea 
 Western yellow wagtail, Motacilla flava 
 Eastern yellow wagtail, Motacilla tschutschensis 
 White wagtail, Motacilla alba (A)
 Madanga, Madanga ruficollis (E)
 Richard's pipit, Anthus richardi (A)
 Paddyfield pipit, Anthus rufulus 
 Alpine pipit, Anthus gutturalis
 Pechora pipit, Anthus gustavi -
 Red-throated pipit, Anthus cervinus

Finches, euphonias, and alliesOrder: PasseriformesFamily: Fringillidae

Finches are small to moderately large seed-eating passerine birds with a strong beak, usually conical and in some species very large. All have 12 tail feathers and nine primary flight feathers. Finches have a bouncing flight, alternating bouts of flapping with gliding on closed wings, and most sing well.

 Mountain serin, Chrysocorythus estherae

Old World buntingsOrder: PasseriformesFamily''': Emberizidae

The emberizids are a large family of seed-eating birds with distinctively shaped bills. Many emberizid species have distinctive head patterns.

 Black-headed bunting, Emberiza melanocephala (A)
 Black-faced bunting, Emberiza spodocephala (A)

 See also 
 Fauna of Indonesia
 Fauna of New Guinea
 Lists of birds by region

 References 

 BirdLife International, The World List of Threatened Birds, 
 BirdLife International, Endemic Bird Areas of the World, 
 Morten Strange, A Photographic Guide to the Birds of Indonesia, 
 Periplus Ac+ion Guides, Birding Indonesia, 
 The Howard and Moore, Complete Checklist of the Birds of the World'',

External links 
 BirdLife International
 IUCN Red List

'
birds
Indonesia
Indonesia